= Ken Hydon =

British accountant (born 1944)

Kenneth John Hydon (born November 1944) is a British accountant who has been a director of several FTSE 100 companies: RB (Reckitt Benckiser), Merlin Entertainments Group, Tesco, Pearson, Vodafone and also the Royal Berkshire NHS Foundation Trust, an acute general hospital in the UK.

== Early life ==
Ken Hydon was born in November 1944 in Leicester, England. His father was John Hydon and his mother was Vera.

== Career ==
Hydon was among the cabal that included Sir Christopher Gent and Sir Julian Horn-Smith who transformed Vodafone from a small subsidiary of Racal Electronics to one of the top 25 companies in the world. He was financial director of Vodafone from 1985 until he retired in 2005. He was closely involved in Vodafone's major transactions including the formation of Vodafone AirTouch in 1999 and the agreement to acquire Mannesmann in 2000. He was a member of the Board of Representatives of Verizon Wireless in the US from 2000 until he retired in 2005. He previously joined Racal Electronics in 1977 and was financial director of several Racal subsidiaries.

Hydon was appointed as a non-executive director of RB (Reckitt Benckiser) in 2003 and retired in 2018. In 2004, he was appointed a non-executive director of Tesco and retired in 2013. He joined the board of the Royal Berkshire NHS Foundation Trust as a non executive director in 2005 and retired in 2012 Hydon became a non-executive director of Pearson in February 2006 and retired in 2015. He became a non-executive director of Merlin Entertainments in October 2013 and retired in 2018.

Hydon is a fellow of the Chartered Institute of Management Accountants (CIMA), the Association of Chartered Certified Accountants (ACCA) and the Association of Corporate Treasurers (ACT).

== Personal life ==
Hydon married Sylvia (deceased) in 1966 and they had a son and a daughter.
