= Consultative Committee of Accountancy Bodies =

The Consultative Committee of Accountancy Bodies (CCAB) is an umbrella group of chartered professional bodies of British qualified chartered accountants. The primary objective of the CCAB is to provide a forum for the member bodies to discuss issues of common concern, and where possible, to provide a common voice for the accountancy profession when dealing with the United Kingdom government.

== History ==
The CCAB was founded in 1974 by all six British and Irish professional accountancy bodies with a Royal Charter. The same six bodies are the United Kingdom professional bodies that belong to the International Federation of Accountants. As of 2005, running costs were shared roughly in proportion to shares held, as follows: ICAEW 52%, ACCA 17%, CIMA 15%, CIPFA 6%, ICAS 7% and ICAI 3%.

On 2 March 2011, CIMA announced that it would be leaving CCAB. In the previous decade, CIMA had positioned itself as "a strong supporter and key member of CCAB". However, since the formation of the Financial Reporting Council as the regulator for accounting matters, CCAB had become more focussed on audit and therefore less relevant to CIMA members.

== Members ==
Since 2012, CCAB has five member bodies:

- Chartered Accountants Ireland (CAI, formerly ICAI)
- Institute of Chartered Accountants of Scotland (ICAS)
- Association of Chartered Certified Accountants (ACCA)
- Chartered Institute of Public Finance and Accountancy (CIPFA)
- Institute of Chartered Accountants in England and Wales (ICAEW)

There was previously a sixth founder member, the Chartered Institute of Management Accountants (CIMA). CIMA gave notice in March 2011 of its intention to leave the CCAB. After giving notice to leave, CIMA requested the Head of Government Accounting Services to use a longer formula, "CCAB, CIMA or overseas equivalent".

The five remaining bodies committed themselves to ensure that the CCAB "is the sole voice for the profession on those issues which affect our combined membership." Many job advertisements for accountants in the United Kingdom used to specify "CCAB qualified" in cases where an employer wishes to hire a professional accountant, but has no specific preference as to which institute.

== CCAB – Ireland ==
In the Republic of Ireland, the Consultative Committee of Accountancy Bodies – Ireland (CCAB–I) performs similar functions. Its members are:

- Chartered Accountants Ireland (CAI)
- Association of Chartered Certified Accountants (ACCA)
- Chartered Institute of Management Accountants (CIMA)
- Institute of Certified Public Accountants in Ireland (CPA)

== See also ==
- British qualified accountants
- Institute of Financial Accountants
