= Association of Corporate Treasurers =

The Association of Corporate Treasurers (ACT) is the international professional body specialising in the profession of corporate treasury. It was founded in 1979 and was awarded a Royal Charter on 1 January 2013. It is both an examining body, providing a wide range of qualifications for those working in treasury, risk and corporate finance, and a membership organisation which supports and represents its members.

== Membership ==
There are two possible routes to membership of ACT. Most members are individuals who have completed ACT's professional qualifications.

The levels of membership are:

- Associate Membership (AMCT)
- Membership (MCT)
- Fellowship (FCT)
- Corporate Membership
- International Affiliates

Associates use the designatory letters AMCT, while members are entitled to use the letters MCT. Fellowship is the highest level of membership of the Association and confers the right to use the designatory letters FCT. It is a public recognition of the fact that the individual has made a contribution to the treasury profession.

Many members of the ACT are also qualified accountants who belong to a member organisation of the Consultative Committee of Accountancy Bodies.

The ACT is a member of the European Association of Corporate Treasurers and the International Group of Treasury Associations, the umbrella bodies for corporate treasury organisations in Europe and worldwide.

Fast-track qualification

Automatic exemption from stage 1 of the AMCT Diploma, the Associate Membership qualification is available for all accountants qualified through IFAC member bodies. The ACT also offers a fast-track route for qualified accountants who wish to gain AMCT. This accelerated course of study is open exclusively to ACCA members and affiliates, CIMA members and students, ICAEW members and ICAS members.

== Influence ==
The ACT works with the British government and other bodies including the Confederation of British Industry to help large and medium-sized companies, with a focus on the real economy.

== See also ==
- Certified Treasury Professional
