= Certified Accounting Technician =

The Certified Accounting Technician (CAT) qualification is offered in the United Kingdom by the Association of Chartered Certified Accountants (ACCA). Upon completion of the exams and required practical work experience, the CAT graduate will be able to apply to use the letters CAT after their name.

Although CAT can be obtained as a stand-alone qualification, it is often the case that individuals study for CAT as an introductory qualification in accountancy prior to training to become a Chartered Certified Accountant through the ACCA Professional Scheme. It usually takes one and a half years to complete the nine CAT exams. However, there is no restriction on the number of papers that can be attempted at each sitting.

CAT's rival is the Association of Accounting Technicians (AAT) qualification. ACCA was a sponsor of the AAT before breaking its links in the mid-1990s in order to form the CAT qualification. The rationale behind this move was that it wanted a technician level qualification which followed the same strategic direction of the ACCA qualification, i.e. one with an international profile.

The Certified Accounting Technician qualification (CAT) has now been placed on the Qualifications and Curriculum Authority's national qualifications framework, which means that publicly funded educational institutions are now eligible for grants to help them train individuals towards this qualification in the United Kingdom.

The ACCA has placed the CAT as part of its Foundations in Accountancy suite of qualifications.

== See also ==
- British qualified accountants
- Institute of Accounting Technicians, Canada
- Accounting Technicians Ireland
- Association of Accounting Technicians of Sri Lanka
