= Association of Chartered Certified Accountants =

Global professional organization

- ACCA logo
- Abbreviation: ACCA
- Formation: 30 November 1904; 121 years ago
- Legal status: Chartered
- Purpose: Education and training of members
- Headquarters: London, United Kingdom
- Region served: 180 countries
- Members: 257,900
- President: Ayla Majid
- CEO: Helen Brand
- Main organ: Council
- Revenue: ▲£ 238.7 million (2024)
- Expenses: ▲£ 224.8 million (2024)
- Staff: 1,358
- Students: 530,100
- Website: www.accaglobal.com

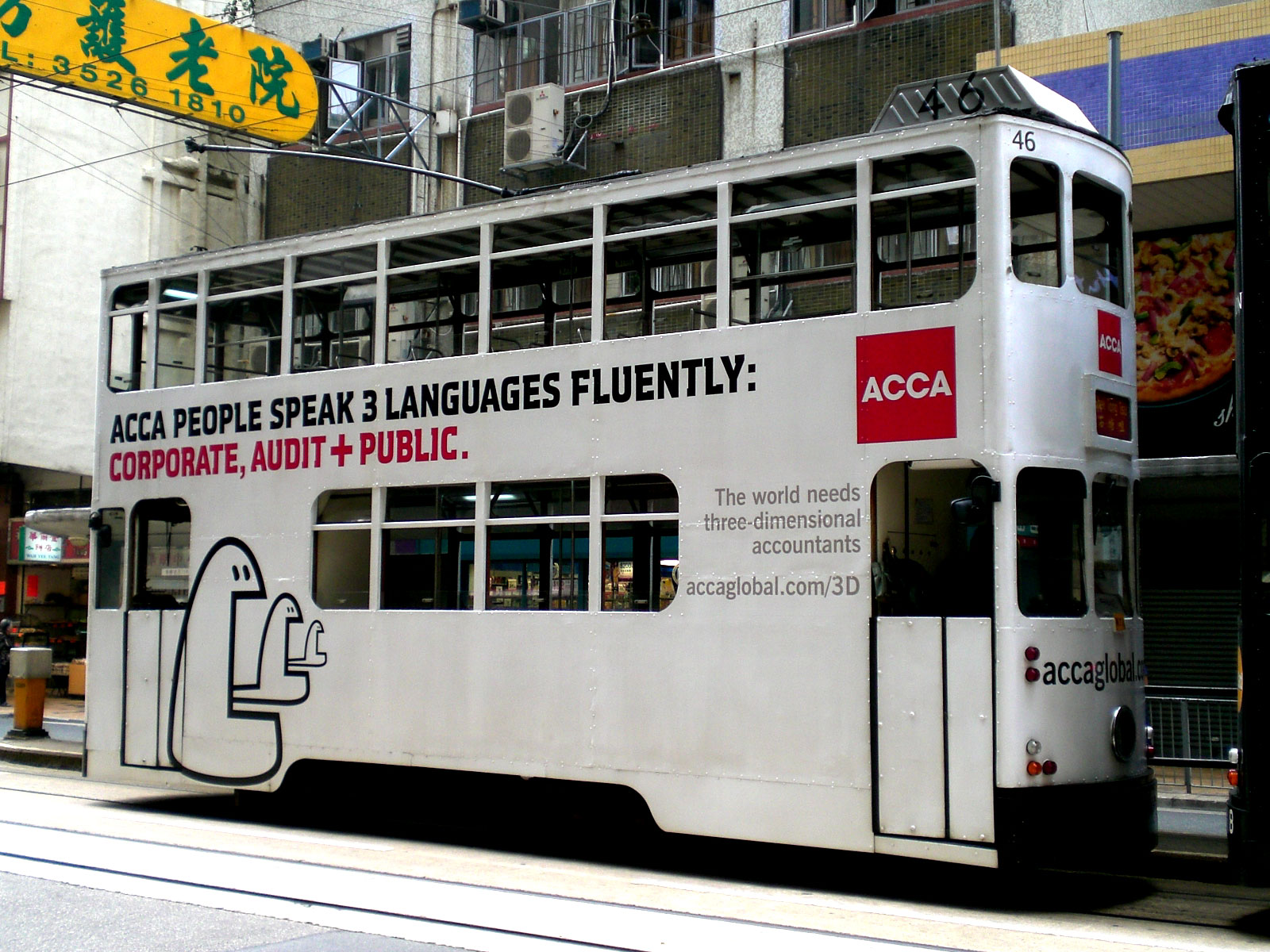
ACCA advertisement on a Hong Kong tram

The Association of Chartered Certified Accountants (ACCA) is the global professional accounting body offering the Chartered Certified Accountant qualification (CCA). Founded in 1904 as the London Association of Accountants, it is one of six chartered accountancy bodies in the UK and Ireland, with over 750,000 members and students in 180 countries. ACCA was granted a royal charter in 1974.

ACCA's recognised qualification of Chartered Certified Accountant is a legally protected term. Individuals who describe themselves as Chartered Certified Accountants must be members of ACCA and if they carry out public practice engagements, must comply with additional regulations such as holding a practising certificate, carrying liability insurance and submitting to inspections.

Under its charter, ACCA's principal objective is advancing the science of accountancy, financial management and related subjects. It also aims to "advance and protect the character of the profession of accountancy" as well as to "promote the highest standards of competence, practice and conduct among members."

== History ==
ACCA traces its origin to 1904, when eight people formed the London Association of Accountants to allow more open access to the profession than was available through the accounting bodies at the time, notably the Institute of Chartered Accountants in England and Wales (ICAEW) and the Institute of Chartered Accountants of Scotland (ICAS). As of 2020, the vision of ACCA is to develop the accountancy profession the world needs.

Key dates in ACCA history include:

- 1909: Ethel Ayres Purdie is elected as the first female associate member of an accounting professional body.
- 1917: London Association of Accountants is the first UK professional body to examine tax.
- 1930: London Association of Accountants successfully campaigned for the right to audit companies.
- 1933: London Association of Accountants renamed to London Association of Certified Accountants.
- 1939: Corporation of Accountants (Scottish body, founded 1891) merged with London Association of Certified Accountants to become the Association of Certified and Corporate Accountants.
- 1941: Institution of Certified Public Accountants (founded 1903, and incorporating the Central Association of Accountants from 1933) merged with Association of Certified and Corporate Accountants.
- 1971: Association of Certified and Corporate Accountants renamed Association of Certified Accountants.
- 1974: Royal Charter granted by Queen Elizabeth II.
- 1974: ACCA became one of six founding members of the Consultative Committee of Accountancy Bodies (CCAB).
- 1977: ACCA became a founding member of the International Federation of Accountants (IFAC).
- 1984: Association of Certified Accountants renamed to Chartered Association of Certified Accountants.
- 1995: ACCA members voted at an extraordinary general meeting to rename itself Association of Chartered Public Accountants and to introduce the designation Chartered Public Accountant. The Privy Council subsequently rejected this proposal over concerns about the term 'public'. It did however agree that any accountancy body bearing a royal charter could use 'chartered' as part of its designation.
- 1996: Chartered Association of Certified Accountants renamed to Association of Chartered Certified Accountants. Members are entitled to use the title Chartered Certified Accountant (Designatory letters ACCA or FCCA). The Association of Authorised Public Accountants (AAPA) became a subsidiary of ACCA. The organisation earned its first Queen's Award, for Export Achievement.
- 1998: ACCA's syllabus formed the basis of the United Nations' global accountancy curriculum titled Guideline on National Requirements for the Qualification of Professional Accountants, published in 1999. ACCA was a participant in the consultative group that devised this global Benchmark.
- 2001: ACCA received a Queen's Award for Enterprise: International Trade, recognising ACCA's growth and its role in 160 countries worldwide.
- 2002: ACCA received its second Queen's Award for Enterprise in the space of 12 months, in the Sustainable Development category. The award recognized ACCA's continuing work on social and environmental issues.
- 2009: ACCA members allowed to provide probate services as of 1 August under Probate Services (Approved Bodies) Order 2009 Number 1588.
- 2011 onward: ACCA is the first accountancy body to publish an integrated annual report.
- 2014: ACCA members and student numbers reached 600,000 worldwide.
- 2015: ACCA launched MSc in Professional Accountancy with the University of London.
- 2016: ACCA formed a strategic alliance with Chartered Accountants Australia and New Zealand (CA ANZ).
- 2017: ACCA reached over 700,000 members and students worldwide, with 208,000 fully qualified members and 503,000 students in 178 countries. The AAPA was absorbed into the ACCA.
- 2018: ACCA introduced Strategic Professional – a new level of the ACCA Qualification.
- 2020: ACCA announces its commitments to the UN Sustainable Development Goals
- 2025: ACCA announces redesign of qualification for a redefined accountancy profession.

== Qualifications ==
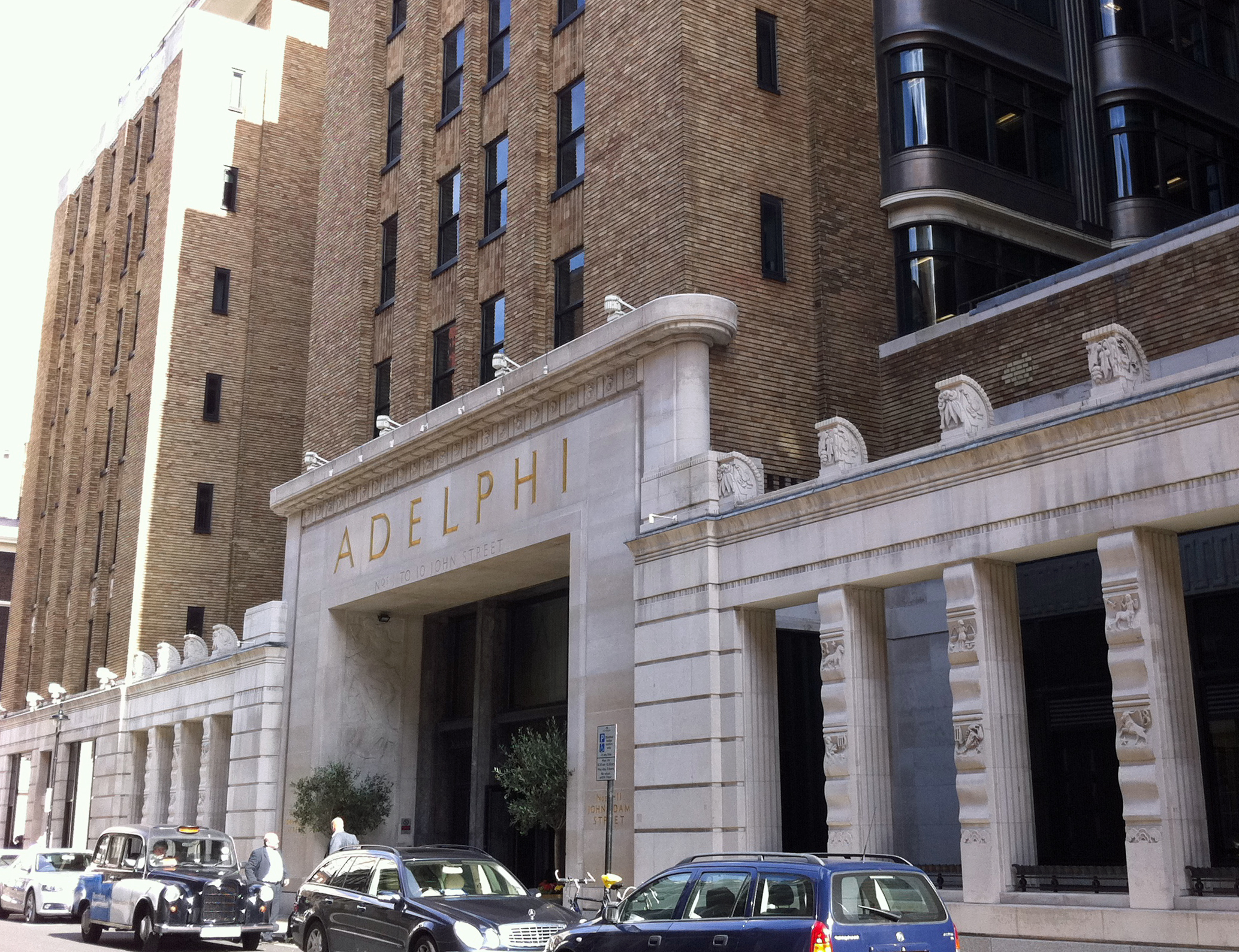
The art deco Adelphi building from the 1930s, located at 1-10 John Adam Street in London, is the current HQ of ACCA

The term Chartered Certified Accountant was introduced in 1996. Prior to that date, ACCA members were known as Certified Accountant. It is still permissible for an ACCA member to use this term. Members of ACCA with post-qualification experience of more than five years and have completed the required continued professional development are designated Fellows, and use the designatory letters FCCA in place of ACCA.

The term Chartered refers to the royal charter granted by Her Majesty Queen Elizabeth II of the United Kingdom.

Chartered Certified Accountants work in all fields of business and finance. Some are engaged in public practice work, others work in the private sector and some are employed by government bodies.

Since Chartered Certified Accountant is a legally protected term, individuals who describe themselves as such must be members of ACCA. If they carry out public practice engagements, they must comply with additional regulations such as holding a practising certificate, being insured against any possible liability claims and submitting to inspections.

ACCA offers the following certifications:

=== Chartered Certified Accountant (ACCA) ===
Chartered Certified Accountant is the professional body's main qualification. Following completion of up to 13 professional examinations, three years of supervised, relevant accounting experience and an ethics module, it enables an individual to become a Chartered Certified Accountant. The ACCA professional examinations are offered worldwide four times yearly in March, June, September and December as paper-based and computer-based exams. On-demand computer-based exams (CBE) are also offered for the first four exams (BT, MA, FA, LW), and Session CBEs for the rest (PM, TX, FR, AA, FM) which are available to be taken at ACCA licensed exam centres. A Bachelor of Science (Honours) degree in Applied Accounting (after completing the Fundamentals level of the exams, the Ethics and Professional Skills module and submitting a Research and Analysis project), is offered in association with Oxford Brookes University.

From September 2018 onward, the syllabus comprises 13 examinations and an Ethics and Professional Skills module (EPSM), although some exemptions are available. In April 2019, a Data Analytics unit was added in EPSM .

The qualification is structured in three modules, plus an Ethics and Professional Skills module and a Professional Experience Requirement (PER).

== Disciplinary proceedings ==
ACCA students, affiliates and members are bound by ACCA rules and regulations. ACCA is able to take disciplinary action (such as revoking ACCA qualification or exacting a fine) against them if they breach ACCA rules. ACCA rules and regulations are governed by English and Welsh law and ACCA disciplinary decisions can only be challenged in England and Wales.

== Legal and mutual recognition ==
=== Europe ===
==== United Kingdom and Ireland ====
The ACCA or Chartered Certified Accountant qualification is fully recognised in both the United Kingdom and Ireland.

- Under its Charter, ACCA works in the public interest.
- It is a Designated Professional Body under the Financial Services and Markets Act, business activities.
- It is a Recognised Professional Body under the Insolvency Act to issue permits to individual Chartered Certified Accountants to conduct insolvency appointments.
- It is also a Recognised Qualifying Body and Recognised Supervisory Body in relation to company auditing under the Companies Act of 1989.
- ACCA is a member of the Consultative Committee of Accountancy Bodies (CCAB). Members of these bodies are deemed to hold equivalent-level qualifications and advertisements for jobs often state that an organisation is looking for a CCAB-qualified individual.
- Full members of CCAB organisations including ACCA could apply for ICAEW membership subject to certain criteria.
- Only ACCA, ICAEW, ICAS, Association of International Accountants (AIA) and Chartered Accountants Ireland (CA Ireland) are able to authorise members to conduct audit, insolvency and investment business work in both the United Kingdom and Ireland.
- Outside these countries, legal recognition by government authorities and mutual recognition by equivalent overseas institutes, varies. Where full legal or mutual recognition is not available, ACCA members can sometimes obtain advanced standing in terms of sitting local accountancy examinations. ACCA's strong global reputation may make it unnecessary to acquire a local designation.
- Similarly, many universities and educational providers recognise ACCA as equivalent to at least a Bachelor's degree in accountancy, for the purpose of obtaining credit towards a local master's degree or an advanced study program.

The Quality and Qualifications Ireland (QQI) assigned ACCA Qualification to 'Level 8' of the Irish National Framework of Qualifications (NFQ) in 2018. Level 8 holds Irish postgraduate qualifications, such as postgraduate diplomas and master's degrees.

In 2011, the Financial Reporting Council (FRC; then Professional Oversight Board) published information for the first time about its concerns over self-regulation by particular institutes. Press reports highlighted comments about ACCA, which had implemented recommendations to improve its examination syllabus, but needed to pay greater attention to monitoring long-time members. In 2011, 2012 and 2013 the ACCA professional body had the highest percentage of A&B (best) outcomes from FRC's Recognised Supervisory Body (RSB) visits to a sample of 'Registered UK Audit Firms'. ACCA firms tend to audit smaller and less complex clients.

As of 2023 there were over 113,000 members and 72,000 students in the UK & Ireland.

==== European Union (EU), European Economic Area (EEA) & Switzerland ====
The ACCA qualification is legally recognized by all member countries of the European Union under the Mutual Recognition Directive. This recognition extends to the European Economic Area nations and Switzerland. For example, a holder of the ACCA could practice as an accountant in all member countries of the European Union, European Economic Area and Switzerland, describing himself/herself as ACCA or Chartered Certified Accountant. Access to local professional qualifications requires a separate test.

At the end of 2016 there were over 16,000 members and almost 60,000 students in Europe (excluding the UK & Ireland).

==== Turkey ====
ACCA and the Union of Chambers of Certified Public Accountants of Turkey (TÜRMOB) signed a partnership agreement in 2004 which enables TÜRMOB members resident in Turkey to follow the ACCA Strategic Professional level and achieve ACCA membership.

=== North America ===
==== United States ====
- In June 2012, ACCA and Institute of Management Accountants (IMA) announced a strategic partnership. The two bodies joined forces to empower accountants and financial professionals to drive business performance. In January 2013, the ICMA Board of Regents, representing the certification division of IMA, voted to waive its usual bachelor's degree requirement for ACCA members wishing to earn IMA's Certified Management Accountant (CMA) credential. The bachelor's degree waiver will allow all ACCA members around the world, regardless of background, access to IMA's CMA credential. This is a benefit to ACCA members who wish to have a US-based credential.
- There is no mutual recognition between ACCA and the American Institute of Certified Public Accountants (AICPA)/National Association of State Boards of Accountancy (NASBA).

At the end of 2016 there were 2,015 members in the US.

==== Canada ====
ACCA announced a Mutual Recognition Agreement with Certified General Accountant (CGA Canada) effective from 1 January 2007; renewed in 2011 for a further 5 years period until December 2017. As of 2006, Canadian Institute of Chartered Accountants (CICA), World Education Services and the Odette School of Business at the University of Windsor indicated that the evaluation recognized ACCA as having the Canadian equivalence of a bachelor's degree (four years) in Accounting. The Canadian branch of ACCA is pursuing recognition for statutory audit purposes in the province of Ontario under the province's Public Accounting Act of 2004.

Canadian Institute of Chartered Accountants and Certified Management Accountants of Canada (CMA Canada) announced a joint qualification 'Chartered Professional Accountant or CPA Designation', but whether this designation will impinge on ACCA's application for recognition in Ontario is uncertain.

On 29 November 2012 the ACCA opened up legal proceedings against the CICA to operate in Canada, complicated by the merger of the accounting profession in Canada, incorporating CICA, CMA Canada and CGA to use 'Chartered Professional Accountant (CPA)'. A 10-year transitional period requires all CPA members to use CPA, 'legacy designation' rather than the newer designation. The merger completed in 2015.

At the end of 2016 there were 3,011 members in Canada.

As of 2024, there were over 5,000 members and 2,000 students.

=== Oceania ===
==== Australia ====
ACCA has an office in Sydney and holds exams in major cities including Sydney, Melbourne, Perth, Adelaide and Brisbane.

ACCA members are not eligible to be registered company auditors as of right.CPA Australia and Institute of Public Accountants recognise ACCA qualification as sufficient to obtain a skill assessment as an Accountant for the purposes of immigration. The Tax Practitioners Board accredited ACCA as a recognised tax agent association and as a recognised BAS agent association on 12 May 2010.Member | IFAC

Subject to passing exams in Australian tax and law, ACCA members may obtain the equivalent level of membership from the Institute of Public Accountants.

===== CA ANZ Strategic Alliance =====
In June 2016, the Association of Chartered Certified Accountants (ACCA) and Chartered Accountants Australia and New Zealand (CA ANZ), announced a strategic alliance. ACCA members do not qualify to become a full member of CA ANZ, additional requirements relating to residency and membership length must be satisfied before CA ANZ membership may be granted.

At the end of 2016 there were 3,414 members and 1,721 students in Australia.

==== New Zealand ====
ACCA member, affiliate and student activities in New Zealand are managed by its office in Australia, supported by Network Panel members based in Auckland and Wellington as well as member advocates based in Christchurch.

With the merger of Institute of Chartered Accountants Australia (ICAA) and the New Zealand Institute of Chartered Accountants in December 2014, the newly created 'Chartered Accountants Australia and New Zealand (CA ANZ)' became the sole national accountancy body in New Zealand, which is in a strategic alliance with the ACCA.

At the end of 2016 there were 502 members in New Zealand.

=== Caribbean, Central and South America ===
The ACCA is an affiliate of the Institute of Chartered Accountants of the Caribbean. The ACCA qualification is legally recognized in the French Guiana (Part of France and hence subject to European Union regulations).

At the end of 2016 there were 4,857 members and 16,000 students in the Caribbean.

=== Africa ===
==== Kenya ====
ACCA is recognised in Kenya and has an office in the country. Some universities offer ACCA.

==== Namibia ====
ACCA was awarded full and unconditional accreditation status as a professional body in Namibia by the statutory Public Accountants' and Auditors' Board (PAAB) on 24 November 2016. The PAAB is a statutory body established to oversee the profession and maintain a register of persons entitled to work or practise as public accountants or public auditors in Namibia.

==== South Africa ====
Although ACCA holds recognition for statutory tax purposes, it has no agreement with any accountancy body in South Africa, while ICAEW, ICAS and CA Ireland have agreements with South African Institute of Chartered Accountants.On 6 July 2023, the Independent Regulatory Board for Auditors, formally accredited the ACCA as an additional route for future members to attain the Registered Auditor in South Africa. Only members of the ACCA and South African Institute of Chartered Accountants can carry out External Audits in the country from 1 April 2024.

==== Zimbabwe ====
ACCA Zimbabwe is one of the constituent bodies of the Public Accountants and Auditors Board (PAAB). The PAAB is a statutory body established in 1996 to oversee the profession and maintain a register of persons entitled to work or practise as public accountants or public auditors in Zimbabwe. Only ACCA members in good standing and Institute of Chartered Accountants of Zimbabwe can register as auditors.

=== Asia ===
==== China ====
ACCA entered China in late 1980s, and has developed its China base rapidly in recent years. It has entered into agreements with 41 Chinese Universities, many of which are leading in the disciplines of finance and accounting as well as having excellent academic reputations in a wider range of subjects. The most well known institutions include Tsinghua University, Xiamen University, Central University of Finance and Economics, Shanghai University of Finance and Economics, Southwestern University of Finance and Economics, Xi'an Jiaotong University and Sun Yat-Sen University.

As of early 2025, ACCA had 29,000 members and 103,800 students in China, with 11 offices in Beijing, Changsha, Shanghai, Chengdu, Guangzhou, Shenzhen, Shenyang, Qingdao, Wuhan, Hong Kong SAR, and Macau SAR.

==== Hong Kong ====
An Agreement of Recognition Arrangement (ARA) between ACCA and Hong Kong Institute of Certified Public Accountants (HKICPA; local statutory accountancy body) was put in place on 22 August 2006, backdated to 1 July 2005. This was less flexible than the previous rule.

The old agreement was terminated on 30 June 2005 forcing ACCA members to accept the so-called "8 unfair terms" e.g., hold a degree recognised by HKICPA, work under HKICPA authorised employers, attend workshops and pass HKICPA's Final Professional Examination (FPE), etc.

This notwithstanding, HKICPA members could join in ACCA without any further requirement.

The ACCA qualification is highly accepted by the Hong Kong employment market. Most HKICPA members qualified through a joint scheme with Hong Kong Society of Accountants (HKSA) which operated for more than 20 years. HKSA later became HKICPA.

At the end of 2016 there were 18,238 members and over 8,000 students in Hong Kong.

==== India ====
UK qualified students are eligible for exemptions in the following papers of the CMA qualification (2012 syllabus) offered by The Institute of Cost Accountants of India:

Foundation: Complete exemption.

Intermediate:

Paper 5- Financial Accounting

Paper 6- Laws, Ethics & Governance

Paper 8- Cost Accounting and Financial Management

Paper 10- Cost and Management Accountancy

Paper 12- Company Accounts and Audit

Final:

Paper 14- Advanced Financial Management

Paper 15- Business Strategy and Strategic Cost Management

Paper 17- Strategic Performance Management

Paper 18- Corporate Financial Reporting

Paper 20- Financial Analysis and Business Valuation

In 2021, ACCA India organized a nationwide 'Financial Literacy Drive' for children. The programme was delivered with the help of ACCA members in India

At the end of 2023, there were approximately 130,000 students in India.

==== Macau ====
ACCA currently is legally recognised with the joint scheme relationships by Macau Society of Certified Practising Accountants (local statutory accountancy body) in Macau.

==== Malaysia ====
On 13 August 2007, ACCA and the Malaysian Institute of Certified Public Accountants (MICPA) signed an MRA that provided a route for members to join the other body. The ACCA or Chartered Certified Accountant qualification, along with 10 other professional accounting qualifications, is recognised by the Malaysian Institute of Accountants (MIA). MIA also recognises 21 Malaysian university qualifications as a prerequisite for registration as a chartered accountant in Malaysia. Only MIA members qualify as accountants in Malaysia under the Accountants Act, 1967.

ACCA is statutorily recognised in Part II of the First Schedule of the Accountants Act, 1967. Therefore, ACCA qualification is eligible to be admitted as MIA member, which then opens the opportunity to practice as a public accountant (audit firm). One has to attend MIA public practice programme and then apply for audit approval and passed the audit approval interview.

At the end of 2016 there were 12,521 members and 42,000 students in Malaysia.

As of early 2024, there were 19,576 members and over 42,000 students in Malaysia.

==== Nepal ====
From 2014, Tribhuwan University has recognized ACCA (after full membership) as equivalent to bachelor's degree if pursued after intermediate level. This has been stopped from 2020

==== Pakistan ====
The ACCA qualification confers the Qualified Company Secretary designation in Pakistan. ACCA and the local statutory accounting body Institute of Chartered Accountants of Pakistan (ICAP) offer partial recognition of each other.

The Higher Education Commission (HEC) of Pakistan recognises ACCA members qualifications as equal to master's degree in Commerce (MCom). ICAP also awards some exemptions to ACCA affiliates.

On 4 December 2014, ACCA and ICMAP (Institute of Cost and Management Accountants of Pakistan) signed an MOU to enhance the existing academic recognition arrangements between the two accounting bodies. This MoU shall facilitate students and members of ACCA and ICMA Pakistan to earn dual qualification and membership on a fast track basis.

At the end of 2016, there were 3,843 members and over 37,000 students in Pakistan.

==== Singapore ====
In Singapore, holders of ACCA had until 31 December 2016 and existing students have until 31 December 2018 to complete the ICPAS PAC and qualify for the Chartered Accountant of Singapore professional designation through the previous transitional arrangements.

==== Taiwan ====
According to rules 6(iii) & 9 of accountancy examination published by Taiwan government, ACCA members are entitled to obtain advanced standing in the examinations to become a Certified Public Accountant in Taiwan.

==== United Arab Emirates ====
In March 2014, ACCA signed a strategic partnership agreement with UAE's national accountancy body Accountants and Auditors Association (AAA) to help the latter develop a new Chartered Accountant qualification nationwide. The exams will be held jointly, and successful graduates will gain both ACCA and UAE's new Chartered Accountants' qualifications – the UAECA (United Arab Emirates Chartered Accountant). Also the Bachelor of Science in Accounting programme at Ajman University recognised professional body. Graduates can benefit from exemptions from eight out of nine exams required for the ACCA qualification.

== Global qualification partnerships ==
Through partnerships with professional institutions, ACCA offers students and members access to other related qualifications.

=== Academic qualifications ===
- BSc (Hons) in Applied Accounting, with Oxford Brookes University. Oxford Brookes Business School (OBBS) announced on its website that the BSc Applied Accounting will not be available after May 2026.
- MSc in Professional Accountancy, with the University of London
- Global MBA, with Oxford Brookes University (accelerated for ACCA)
- Public Policy and Management offering from SOAS, the University of London

=== Professional qualifications and other accreditations ===
- Advanced Diploma in International Taxation (ADIT) with the Chartered Institute of Taxation (CIOT)
- CMA (Certified Management Accountant) program with Institute of Management Accountants (IMA)
- Certificate in Treasury (CertT) qualification with Association of Corporate Treasurers (ACT)
- Membership of the Chartered Institute for Securities and Investment (CISI)
- Chartered Manager Award with Chartered Management Institute (CMI)
- Certified Internal Auditor (CIA) certification with the Institute of Internal Auditors (IIA)
- Chartered Tax Adviser (CTA) qualification with the Chartered Institute of Taxation (CIOT) (UK only)
- Chartered Institute for Securities & Investment (CISI) Management (Pakistan only)
- Certified Fraud Examiner with Association of Certified Fraud Examiners (ACFE) in USA
- The Institute of Cost Accountants of India (ICMAI)

== Representation worldwide ==
ACCA is represented on many committees and bodies around the world, including the following:

- Accountancy Europe (formerly FEE)
- Africa Capacity Building Foundation
- ASEAN Federation of Accountants (AFA)
- Confederation of Asian and Pacific Accountants (CAPA)
- Consultative Committee of Accountancy Bodies (CCAB)
- Eastern, Central and Southern African Federation of Accountants (ECSAFA)
- European Association of Craft, Small and Medium-Sized Enterprises (UEAPME)
- European Financial Reporting Advisory Group
- Fédération des Experts Comptables Méditerranéens (FCM)
- Global Reporting Initiative (GRI)
- IFAC Board
- IFAC International Auditing and Assurance Standards Board (IAASB)
- IFAC International Public Sector Accounting Board
- IFAC Professional Accountants in Business Committee
- IFAC Small and Medium-Sized Practices Committee
- Institute of Chartered Accountants of the Caribbean (ICAC)
- Inter-American Accounting Association (IAA)
- International Federation of Accountants (IFAC)
- International Integrated Reporting Committee (IIRC)
- Organisation for Economic Co-operation and Development (OECD)
- Pan African Federation of Accountants (PAFA)
- Professional Accountancy Organization Development Committee (PAODC)
- South Eastern European Partnership on Accountancy Development (SEEPAD)
- The Conference Board Europe

| Country/Region | Organisation |
|---|---|
| Americas | Interamerican Accounting Association |
| Argentina | Federación Argentina de Consejos Profesionales de Ciencias Económicas |
| Armenia | Association of Accountants and Auditors of Armenia |
| Azerbaijan | Chamber of Auditors of Azerbaijan Republic |
| Bahamas | Bahamas Chamber of Commerce and Industry Bahamas Institute of Chartered Accountants |
| Barbados | Barbados Small Business Association Institute of Chartered Accountants of Barbados |
| Belize | Institute of Chartered Accountants of Belize |
| Botswana | Botswana Institute of Accountants |
| Brazil | Instituto dos Auditores Independentes do Brasil |
| Brunei | Brunei Darussalam Institute of Certified Public Accountants |
| Cambodia | Ministry of Economy and Finance Kampuchea Institute of Certified Public Accountants and Auditors |
| Canada | Certified General Accountants' Association of Canada |
| Caribbean | Institute of Chartered Accountants of the Caribbean |
| China | China National Audit Office Chinese Institute of Certified Public Accountants |
| Cyprus | Institute of Certified Public Accountants of Cyprus |
| Czech Republic | Chamber of Auditors of the Czech Republic Union of Accountants of the Czech Republic |
| East Africa | Eastern Central and Southern African Federation of Accountants |
| Eastern Caribbean | Institute of Chartered Accountants of the Eastern Caribbean |
| Egypt | Egyptian Society of Accountants and Auditors |
| Ethiopia | Ethiopian Professional Association of Accountants and Auditors |
| Europe | Accountancy Europe (formerly Fédération des Experts Comptables Européens) South Eastern European Partnership on Accountancy Development |
| Georgia | The Georgian Federation of Professional Accountants and Auditors |
| Greece | Institute of Certified Public Accountants of Greece |
| Guyana | Institute of Chartered Accountants of Guyana |
| Hong Kong | Hong Kong Institute of Certified Public Accountants |
| Indonesia | Ikatan Akuntan Indonesia |
| Iran | Iranian Association of Certified Public Accountants |
| Ireland | Institute of Certified Public Accountants in Ireland |
| Jamaica | Institute of Chartered Accountants of Jamaica Jamaica Business Development Corporation |
| Jordan | Jordanian Association of Certified Public Accountants |
| Kenya | Institute of Certified Public Accountants of Kenya |
| Lesotho | Lesotho Institute of Accountants |
| Malawi | Public Accountants Examination Council of Malawi |
| Malaysia | Malaysian Institute of Certified Public Accountants |
| Malta | Malta Institute of Accountants |
| Mexico | Instituto Mexicano de Contadores Públicos |
| Moldova | Association of Professional Accountants and Auditors of Moldova |
| Nigeria | Institute of Chartered Accountants of Nigeria |
| Poland | Accountants Association in Poland Polish Chambers of Statutory Auditors (KIBR) |
| Romania | Body of Expert and Licensed Accountants of Romania Chamber of Financial Auditors of Romania |
| Serbia | Serbian Association of Accountants and Auditors |
| Sierra Leone | Institute of Chartered Accountants of Sierra Leone |
| Singapore | Institute of Singapore Chartered Accountants |
| Sri Lanka | Institute of Chartered Accountants of Sri Lanka |
| Swaziland | Swaziland Institute of Accountants |
| Tanzania | National Board of Accountants and Auditors |
| Thailand | Federation of Accounting Professions |
| Trinidad and Tobago | Institute of Chartered Accountants of Trinidad and Tobago The Business Development Company Limited |
| Turkey | Union of Chambers of Certified Public Accountants of Turkey |
| Ukraine | Chamber of Auditors of Ukraine Ukrainian Federation of Professional Accountants and Auditors |
| United Arab Emirates | Accountants & Auditors Association Dubai Financial Services Authority |
| United Kingdom | Association of Accounting Technicians Chartered Institute of Securities and Investments Chartered Institute of Taxation |
| Uruguay | Colegio de Contadores, Economistas y Administradores del Uruguay |
| Vietnam | Ministry of Finance of the Socialist Republic of Vietnam State Audit Office of Vietnam Vietnam Accounting Association Vietnam Association of Certified Public Accountants |
| Zambia | Lusaka Stock Exchange Zambia Chamber of Small & Medium Business Associations Zambia Institute of Chartered Accountants |

== See also ==
- Association of Authorised Public Accountants (AAPA - Subsidiary of ACCA)
- Certified Accounting Technician (CAT)
- Chartered Certified Accountant (ACCA/FCCA)
