= Geoffrey Sumner (banker) =

- Born: 1953 (age 71–72); Cheshire England
- Notable credit(s): Banker, Non-executive director, Consultant

Geoffrey Sumner (born 1953) is a Scottish/English banker, non-executive director and an independent consultant. He is the former CEO, France and Belgium of Lloyds TSB (Lloyds Banking Group).

== Education ==
Sumner qualified as an Associate of the Chartered Institute of Bankers in 1976(now The London Institute of Banking & Finance) and was elected to Fellowship in 2004. He is an Associate of the Association of Corporate Treasurers London, England (1996) and a Fellow of the Chartered Banker Institute, Scotland (2002). He holds the République Française Diplôme d’ Études en langue française 1er Degré (2001).

== Career ==
Sumner worked with National Westminster Bank plc from 1972 for eight years. He joined Algemene Bank Nederland (now ABN AMRO) in 1979 then TSB Group in 1990. He was heavily involved in many different aspects of the merger between Lloyds Bank and the TSB Group plc in the mid-1990s. He was appointed Country Manager Belgium, Lloyds TSB in 2002 then served as CEO France and Belgium for Lloyds TSB during the years 2006 to 2007. He left Lloyds TSB in June 2007 to found his own consulting firm. He was a director and trustee of the Scottish children's charity Smart Play Network between March 2016 and August 2020.
