= Institute of Accounting Technicians =

The Institute of Accounting Technicians (Canada) is a not-for-profit professional body for those working as accounting technicians and in accounting fields.

The Institute's educational program is recognized for exemptions by:

- Association of Accounting Technicians (AAT)
- Association of Chartered Certified Accountants (ACCA)
- Chartered Institute of Management Accountants (CIMA)
