= British qualified accountants =

Full voting members of accountant evaluation bodies

British qualified accountants are full voting members of United Kingdom professional bodies that evaluate individual experience and test competencies for accountants.

The term accountant has the same legal protection in the United Kingdom as that given to other professions. Only certain functions are restricted to professionally qualified accountants; for example, individuals who operate in the areas of audit and insolvency must be registered, and only members of certain accountancy bodies are eligible for such registration. If working in public practice, these qualified accountants must comply with additional regulations such as holding professional indemnity insurance (as accountants are one of the professions most likely to face a professional indemnity claim) and submitting to regular and independent inspections.

CCAB-qualified accountants is an informal shorthand for full members of any of the UK accountancy bodies formed by royal charter. All six of these bodies founded the Consultative Committee of Accountancy Bodies in 1974; CIMA left after 2011, but its members may still be intended when this phrase is used.

The British Government's Department for Business, Innovation and Skills, implementing the Companies Acts 1989 and 2006, allows members of six bodies to act as auditor to a limited company. These are the five member bodies of CCAB, and the AIA. In the European Union, under the EU mutual recognition directive, members of these six bodies may practise auditing in other EU member states, with 'absolute equal status'.

In addition, there are other non-CCAB bodies whose members also provide accountancy and related services.

== Recognised bodies for restricted work ==
=== Audit of limited companies ===
It is illegal for any individual or firm that is not a Registered Auditor to perform an audit of a UK limited company. To become a Registered Auditor, an accountant must hold a practising certificate from a recognised body, demonstrate the necessary professional ability in that area, and submit to regular inspection.

Certain bodies, known under the Companies Acts 1989 and 2006 as Recognised Qualifying Bodies (RQBs), award the qualifications necessary for audit work, as an entry requirement. A similar but not identical list of Recognised Supervisory Bodies (RSBs) may authorise their members to carry out company audits.

The six RQBs in relation to company auditing under the Companies Acts are:

- Association of Chartered Certified Accountants (ACCA)
- Association of International Accountants (AIA)
- Chartered Accountants Ireland (CAI)
- Institute of Chartered Accountants in England and Wales (ICAEW)
- Institute of Chartered Accountants of Scotland (ICAS)
- Chartered Institute of Public Finance and Accountancy (CIPFA) since 2006 but currently in abeyance

The AIA and CIPFA are not RSBs; their members, if engaging in audit, must therefore be supervised by another body. The Association of Authorised Public Accountants (AAPA) has the status of RSB, historically under a grandfather clause in order to supervise individuals who had been authorised for audit purposes under the Companies Act 1948.

RQBs and RSBs are self-regulated but monitored by the Professional Oversight Board (POB), part of the Financial Reporting Council (FRC), to support public confidence.

Under the European Union's Mutual Recognition Directive, all British accountants with practising rights and belonging to a RQB/RSB can practice as a public accountants in all member countries of the European Union, European Economic Area and Switzerland, providing that they are citizens of one of these states. They can describe themselves only by their own accountancy qualification rather than the local professional accountant qualification; access to the local professional qualifications is based on an aptitude test.

Various other national bodies have mutual recognition agreements with most British RQBs. For example, in Hong Kong, members of RQBs excluding CIPFA are accredited by HKICPA and therefore licensed under the Professional Accountants Ordinance with 'absolute equal status' to local CPAs.

=== Insolvency and investment business work ===
Under the Companies Act, Insolvency Act & Financial Services and Markets Act, only the ACCA, ICAEW, CAI and ICAS are able to authorise members to conduct all the legally restricted work of insolvency and 'investment business work' in the United Kingdom.

== Titles of British accountancy qualifications ==
In the UK, there is no licence requirement for individuals to describe themselves or practise as an accountant (except for audit or insolvency work). However, to use certain titles and designatory letters requires membership of the appropriate professional body, thus:

- Bodies with royal charter
  - Certified Public Accountants may be members of the Certified Public Accountants Association (CPAA) (designatory letters ACPA or FCPA), or of a CPA body in another country
  - Chartered Accountants must be members of one of the following:
    - the Institute of Chartered Accountants in England & Wales (ICAEW) (designatory letters ACA or FCA)
    - the Institute of Chartered Accountants of Scotland (ICAS) (designatory letters CA)
    - Chartered Accountants Ireland (CAI) (designatory letters ACA or FCA)
    - a recognised equivalent body in another Commonwealth country (designatory letters being CA (name of country) e.g. CA(Canada))
  - Chartered Certified Accountants must be members of the Association of Chartered Certified Accountants (ACCA) (designatory letters ACCA or FCCA)
  - Chartered Public Finance Accountants must be members of the Chartered Institute of Public Finance and Accountancy (CIPFA) (designatory letters CPFA)
  - Chartered Management Accountants must be members of the Chartered Institute of Management Accountants (CIMA) (designatory letters ACMA or FCMA)
- Other recognised bodies (RQBs and RSBs)
  - International Accountants must be members of the Association of International Accountants (AIA), one of six Recognised Qualifying Bodies in the UK (designatory letters AAIA or FAIA)
  - Authorised Public Accountants must be members of the Association of Authorised Public Accountants (AAPA), one of five Recognised Supervisory Bodies in the UK (designatory letters AAPA)
- Other professional bodies
  - Institute of Financial Accountants (IFA) (designatory letters AFA or FFA), a professional accountancy body representing and providing certification for financial accountants in the United Kingdom. The IFA is a full member of the International Federation of Accountants (IFAC).
  - Association of Accounting Technicians (AAT) (designatory letters MAAT or FMAAT)

=== Entry requirements ===
The chartered bodies and the AIA (which is the other Recognised Qualifying Body) admit members only after passing examinations and undergoing a period of relevant work experience. Syllabi and methods of assessment vary between these bodies, and may include a project, case study or viva (One-to-one case study and oral examination). Candidates who hold degrees in accounting or related subjects may be exempt from certain papers. Some bodies, including ICAEW, provide direct membership exchanges and short routes to admittance for members of certain overseas bodies. Once admitted, members are expected to comply with ethical guidelines, gain appropriate professional experience and undergo continuing professional development.

The other bodies recognise academic qualifications and work experience.

Most bodies offer Fellowship after five or ten years' further experience in good standing as an Associate member.

=== Practising certificates ===
Before engaging in practice (i.e. selling services to the public rather than acting as an employee), an accountant belonging to any of these bodies must gain a 'practising certificate' by meeting further requirements such as purchasing adequate insurance and undergoing inspections.

== Bookkeepers and accounting technicians ==
Individuals with such qualifications are recognised as professionally qualified bookkeepers.

The Association of Accounting Technicians (AAT) is the UK's leading body offering a qualification at 'bookkeeper' level. The AAT has approximately 2,500 licensed bookkeepers (from a total membership of 150,000). The AAT is recognised in the EU and internationally respectively.

AAT also offer higher level qualifications which enable the holder to gain "licensed accountant" status, of which there are 5,100 (2021). Licensed AAT accountants are MAATs (Members of AAT) of if they have five years of experience and an unblemished record they can take advantage of the FMAAT (Fellow) designation. These licensed accountants hold a lower level qualification than Chartered Accountants https://www.icaew.com/start-your-career/how-to-become-a-chartered-accountant/icaew-routes/aat-aca and they are not permitted to undertake audit work. These 5,000+ AAT Licensed Accountants provide tax and accountancy services to over 500,000 small businesses and individuals in the UK.

AAT members can claim a range of exemptions from ACCA, ICAEW, ICAS, CIPFA and CIMA examinations and vice versa. Many AAT students go on to study for Chartered status with one of the Chartered bodies with approximately 30% of Chartered body membership comprising those who began their studies with AAT. AAT has also been a full member of the International Federation of Accountants (IFAC) since 2012.

The Institute of Accountants & Bookkeepers (IAB) also offer Qualifications and Credit Framework (QCF) qualification specifically in bookkeeping and Payroll. IAB members are professionally qualified accountants and bookkeepers. Members use designatory letters AIAB standing for "Associate Member of the IAB", MIAB "Member of the IAB and FIAB "Fellow Member of the IAB". After passing exams and obtaining relevant experience, its members can apply for a Certificates of Supervision, Certificate of Compliance and eventually Certificates in Practice status, depending on membership level and experience, and are then licensed and regulated by the IAB to provide practice bookkeeping, accounting, tax and financial advisory services, although they are not entitled to undertake audit or insolvency work. As in the case of members of the RQBs, IAB practising members are required to hold adequate insurances and undertake regular CPD activities relevant to the services they offer. Although not sponsored by any other professional body, IAB qualifications are recognised by many of the bodies and members may, depending on the qualifications they hold apply for some exemptions to the other professional bodies.

AIA also offers IAT with the London Chamber of Commerce & Industry. IFA offers Financial Accounting Technician (AFT)

The Institute of Certified Bookkeepers (ICB), founded in the UK in 1996, claims over 150,000 students and members worldwide.

== CCAB-qualified accountants ==
The Consultative Committee of Accountancy Bodies (known as CCAB) was formed in 1974 as an umbrella group for the major British qualified accountancy bodies. The six British and Irish professional accountancy bodies with a royal charter were the founder members of the CCAB. On 2 March 2011, the Chartered Institute of Management Accountants (CIMA) announced that it would be leaving CCAB, because CCAB had become more focussed on audit since the formation of the Financial Reporting Council as the regulator for accounting matters, and therefore less relevant to CIMA members.

The remaining members are:

- Association of Chartered Certified Accountants (ACCA)
- Chartered Accountants Ireland (CAI) which covers the Republic of Ireland and Northern Ireland, and is considered to be both a British and Irish professional body
- Chartered Institute of Public Finance and Accountancy (CIPFA)
- Institute of Chartered Accountants in England and Wales (ICAEW)
- Institute of Chartered Accountants of Scotland (ICAS)

All full members of these bodies and CIMA are deemed to hold equivalent-level qualifications. Many job advertisements for accountants in the United Kingdom therefore specify 'CCAB qualified' as though it was a specific qualification rather than a group of qualifications. In practice some employers use the term as shorthand for 'professional accountant' and might consider members of non-Chartered bodies or overseas equivalents.

All CCAB bodies were Recognised Qualifying Bodies (RQBs) in relation to company auditing under the Companies Act 2006. In 2018, however, CIPFA's status as an RQB was revoked.
