= Association of Authorised Public Accountants =

The Association of Authorised Public Accountants (AAPA) was a British professional body for public accountants.

The AAPA was formed in 1978 as a professional body for auditors recognised individually under the Companies Act 1948. AAPA achieved formal recognition by the Department of Trade and Industry in 1989 when the Companies Act received Royal Assent. In September 1991, AAPA achieved the status of a Recognised Supervisory Body and eligible AAPA members have since been entitled to use the designation Registered Auditor.

AAPA was not an examining body: all of its members had been admitted either because they have individual audit authorisation or because they have obtained a qualification from another body which was recognised for audit purposes in the UK.

At an Extraordinary General Meeting on 24 June 1996, members of AAPA voted for the body to become a subsidiary company of the Association of Chartered Certified Accountants (ACCA). AAPA was, therefore, a company limited by guarantee and registered in England. While maintaining its own separate and distinctive identity constitutionally, AAPA benefited from a wide range of authorisation and support facilities through the ACCA.

At the Annual General Meeting in October 2016, a resolution was passed to allow all AAPA members to become members of the Association of Chartered Certified Accountants (ACCA) with effect from the 1st January 2017. The Association ceased to generate income from 1st January 2017 as all subscription income and practice certificate income was invoiced to the ACCA. As part of the decision all assets and liabilities of AAPA was transferred to ACCA and the Association effectively became dormant. The transfer was finalised after the completion of the Association's accounts on the 31 March 2017.

== Application for membership ==
Membership is available to those who are in public practice (as principals or employees) in the following categories:

- those who can demonstrate that they obtained individual authorisation to undertake the audit of limited companies under Sections 389(1)(b) or 389(2) of the Companies Act 1985 [as these sections provided prior to their repeal by Companies Act 1989] immediately before 1 January 1990 and the commencement of Section 25 Part II of Companies Act 1989 (or the Northern Ireland equivalent)
- those who hold the recognised professional qualification awarded by the Association of International Accountants (AIA)after June 1991 under the terms of Section 31 of the Companies Act 1989 and who have fulfilled the requisite experience requirements.

(Members in good standing of ACCA and of the Institutes of Chartered Accountants in England and Wales, Scotland and Ireland, who are eligible to hold practising certificates, also have the right to apply for membership of AAPA under the terms of its bye-laws.)

As of 2008 the admission fee is £175. The annual subscription becomes payable from 1 January following the date of admission.

== See also ==
- Association of Chartered Certified Accountants (parent association of AAPA)
- Chartered Certified Accountant (ACCA/FCCA)
- Certified Accounting Technician (CAT)
- British qualified accountants
