= Mary Harris Smith =

British accountant and entrepreneur (1844–1934)

Mary Harris Smith FCA
- Born: 27 November 1844; Kingsland, London, England
- Died: 13 October 1934 (aged 89); St Leonards-on-Sea, England
- Education: King's College School, London, England
- Occupation: Chartered accountant
- Honours: Fellow of the Institute of Chartered Accountants in England and Wales

Mary Harris Smith (27 November 1844 – 13 October 1934) was an accountant and entrepreneur. She became the first woman to complete the Institute of Chartered Accountants in England and Wales qualification but was denied membership because she was a woman. When the Sex Disqualification (Removal) Act was passed in 1919, Harris Smith became the world's first female Chartered Accountant.

== Early life ==
Mary Harris Smith was born to Susanna and Henry Smith in Kingsland, London in November 1844. She developed an interest in accounting from helping her banker father with bookkeeping work that he brought home. When Harris Smith was sixteen, she studied mathematics at King's College School. She went on to take some of the first bookkeeping classes run by the Society for Promoting the Employment of Women (SPEW) in 1860.

== Career ==
Smith worked for a mercantile firm in the City of London for nine years and then went to work as an accountant for the Royal School of Art Needlework. She also audited other organisations' accounts.

Harris Smith set up her own accounting firm in 1887, listing herself as 'M. Harris Smith, Accountant and Auditor' except in women's periodicals where she described herself as a 'lady accountant'.

Harris Smith sought to join the Society of Accountants and Auditors in November 1887, but the president blocked her application. A subsequent resolution on the admission of women was turned down in May 1891.

In July 1891, Harris Smith applied to be a fellow of the Institute of Chartered Accountants in England and Wales. The applications committee recommended her admission, but the solicitor of the organisation said that she was not eligible because the royal charter only referred to males; she was therefore rejected. Emily Davies, connected to Harris Smith via SPEW, then sought for women to be admitted in 1893, but this was also unsuccessful. Harris Smith requested to sit the Institute's examinations in 1896 but was refused.

In 1919, following the passing of the Representation of the People Act 1918 and the Sex Disqualification (Removal) Act, Harris Smith applied again to the Society of Accountants and Auditors, which had changed its rules. She was not eligible to be admitted because she had not passed the organisation's examinations, but she was made an honorary member on 12 November 1919. When Harris Smith was in her seventies, in May 1920, she was finally admitted to the Institute of Chartered Accountants in England and Wales and became a fellow of the Institute and the first woman chartered accountant.

== Feminist campaigning ==
Harris Smith supported various causes seeking to advance women, including the Parliamentary Committee for Women's Suffrage, the Society for the Return of Women as Poor Law Guardians, the Society for Promoting the Employment of Women, the National Union of Women Workers, the Gentlewoman's Employment Club and the Soroptimist Club.

== Death and commemoration ==
Mary Harris Smith, FCA and honorary incorporated accountant, died in a medical nursing home in St Leonards-on-Sea on 7 August 1934.

Upon her appointment in 2019, Fiona Wilkinson, the President of the Institute of Chartered Accountants in England and Wales, announced that one of her aims was to celebrate the centenary of Mary Harris Smith becoming a chartered accountant and member.

On 5 May 2020, the Institute of Chartered Accountants in England and Wales announced the commissioning of a blue plaque in commemoration of Harris Smith, 100 years since the day that she became a member. It will be displayed on the City of London Magistrates' Court, at 1 Queen Victoria Street. close to the site of her now demolished office. It will be only the third blue plaque in the City of London to commemorate an individual woman.
