= Certified Treasury Professional =

Certified Treasury Professional (CTP)
- Industry: Treasury and Finance
- Founded: United States
- Headquarters: Bethesda, Maryland United States

The Certified Treasury Professional (CTP) is a certification awarded by the Association for Financial Professionals (AFP) of Bethesda, Maryland to individuals who meet eligibility criteria and demonstrate current competency standards measured through the CTP examination. More than 30,000 individuals have earned the credential.

== Background ==
Once a CTP, certificants must abide by the CTP Standards of ethical conduct and must enhance their level of knowledge and skills by earning and reporting a prescribed number of continuing finance and business education credits every three years. The credential can be revoked by the Certification Committee of AFP for unethical behavior or by failure to earn and report continuing education credits. Typically, the CTP Exam changes every three years when a new Essentials of Treasury Management text is issued.

Before 1986, the AFP awarded the Certified Cash Manager (CCM) and beginning in 2003 the CCM certification was phased into the current CTP to reflect the expanding role of treasury within corporate finance.

AFP, as of 2019, also awards the Certified Corporate FP&A Professional (FPAC) designation.

== See also ==
- Association of Corporate Treasurers
- Professional certification
- Professional certification in financial services
- List of professional designations in the United States
