= Association of International Accountants =

Professional accountancy body

The Association of International Accountants (AIA)
- Type: Professional association
- Industry: Accountancy & finance
- Founded: England, UK (1928)
- Headquarters: Staithes 3, The Watermark, Metro Riverside, Newcastle upon Tyne, NE11 9SN, United Kingdom
- Website: www.aiaworldwide.com

The Association of International Accountants (AIA) is a professional accountancy body. It was founded in the UK in 1928 and since that date has promoted the concept of ‘international accounting’ to create a global network of accountants in over 85 countries worldwide.

AIA is recognised by the UK Government as a Recognised Qualifying Body for statutory auditors under the Companies Act 2006, as a Prescribed Body under the Companies (Auditing and Accounting) Act 2003 in Ireland, and members qualified as a statutory auditor and registered with a Recognised Supervisory Body (RSB) are able to seek registration as a statutory auditor across the European Union. In the UK, AIA also has supervisory status for its members in the Money Laundering Regulations 2017. The AIA professional qualification is currently recognised in over 30 countries worldwide.

The AIA's head office is in the UK, and it has established branches in Hong Kong, Greece, Cyprus, Ghana, Singapore and Malaysia.

== Membership ==
Associate or Fellow membership

AIA members use the designatory letters FAIA, as a Fellow and AAIA as an Associate. And AIA members can use the title or designation of International Accountant.

Those who achieve the AIA's Recognised Professional Qualification as a company auditor are able to register with a Recognised Supervisory Body (RSB) and undertake company audits of companies of all sizes in the UK in accordance with the UK Companies Acts.

All AIA members must undertake Continuing Professional Development (CPD), are subject to Disciplinary Procedures and adhere to the International Federation of Accountants (IFAC) Code of Ethics. AIA is regulated by the Professional Oversight Board (POB), part of the UK's Financial Reporting Council (FRC).

AIA offers a number of entry levels to applicants, depending on their qualifications and work experience profile.

Student membership is designed for those applicants who wish to undertake the AIA Professional Qualification or Audit Qualification, which is achieved through a combination of work experience and examinations that ensure candidates are equipped with the relevant skills and competencies required to work in this profession.

Academic membership is offered exclusively to academics, who are working at universities or colleges and teaching at lecturer level or above. Applicants could also be a consultant or examiner for a professional body. Academic members are entitled to use the designation FAIA(Acad). AIA Academic Membership does not convey any entitlement to the AIA Professional Qualification.

Direct membership applies to those who have the right to practice in the United Kingdom under Regulation 5 of the European Communities (Recognition of Professional Qualifications) Directive. AIA are also recognised under the EC Audit Directive, which recognises professional qualifications for auditors as defined by the Companies Act 2006. Only applicants who are eligible under this route can apply for direct membership.

=== Audit route ===
As a Recognised Qualifying Body (RQB), AIA is recognised by the UK Government as being eligible to train qualified statutory auditors.

Through a combination of study and work experience, the AIA statutory auditor training program provides a Government recognised qualification.

In addition, candidates need to complete an oral test and on successful completion of all the required elements register with a Recognised Supervisory Body (RSB).

=== MBA Pathways and Diploma Qualifications ===
The AIA collaborates with accredited universities to meet increasing demand for managerial skills and knowledge.

The AIA professional accountancy qualification is accepted as equivalent to a first degree for entry purposes into a growing number of full and part-time MBA programmes in United Kingdom, Ireland, Malaysia, Hong Kong and Cyprus.

In addition to the AIA professional qualification and statutory audit qualification, AIA also offers a number of Diplomas as follows:-

- Diploma in International Financial Reporting Standards (IFRS)
- Diploma in Management Accounting & Costing
- Diploma in Auditing

== Legal & Mutual Recognitions ==
=== Europe ===
==== European Union ====
The AIA qualification is recognised as a Designated Body by the European Union under the Mutual Recognition Directive in respect of the activity of Company Auditor. This recognition extends to the European Economic Area nations.the qualification

==== United Kingdom ====
AIA is a Recognised Qualifying Body (RQB) for statutory auditors under the Companies Act 2006.

AIA qualification was recognised within the Qualifications and Credit Framework (QCF) at levels 5, 6 and 7. AIA was the first professional accountancy body to submit, and have units accepted at the higher levels. The Qualification and Credit Framework was abolished in 2016.

- AIA Level 5 Certificate in Accountancy (QCF) is based on the AIA Foundation Level papers and is the equivalent level of a Diploma in Higher Education.
- AIA Level 6 Graduate Diploma in Accountancy (QCF) is based on the AIA Professional Level 1 papers and is set at bachelor's degree level.
- AIA Level 7 Post-graduate Diploma in Professional Accountancy (QCF) is based on the AIA Professional Level 2 papers and is deemed the equivalent level of a master's degree.

In 2020, The Association of International Accountants (AIA) has surrendered its status as an Ofqual-recognised awarding organisation. Office of Qualifications and Examinations Regulation (Ofqual) is a non-ministerial government department that regulates qualifications, exams and tests in England.

AIA had supervisory status for its members in The Money Laundering, Terrorist Financing and Transfer of Funds (Information on the Payer) Regulations 2017.

AIA is also statutorily recognised and listed accordingly in the Companies Act 1985 (as amended) for the purpose of Reporting Accountants.

AIA full members (AAIA or FAIA) were eligible to apply for membership of the Association of Authorised Public Accountants (AAPA), which is a Recognised Supervisory Body (RSB).

==== Ireland ====
AIA is listed as a Prescribed Body under the Companies (Auditing and Accounting) Act 2003 in Ireland and is supervised by the Irish Auditing and Accounting Supervisory Authority (IAASA).

AIA full members (AAIA or FAIA), particularly those holding practising certificates, are eligible to undertake a wide range of regulated work in Ireland (additional authorisation may be required), including:

- Operate as a Personal Insolvency Practitioner
- Operate in Corporate Insolvency (Liquidator or Examiner)
- Certify the accounts produced by the Boards of Management of certain schools
- Examine accounts of Charities with incomes of less than €100,000
- Produce an Accountants report required of Licensed Property Services
- Advise under the Abhaile Mortgage Arrears Resolution Scheme
- Certify the financial standing of an applicant for a Road Haulage Operators License
- Complete an Independent Accountants Report with respect to certain grants provided by Enterprise Ireland

==== Cyprus ====
The AIA professional qualification is recognised for the purpose of audit of public companies according to article 155(1)(b), Chapter 113, of the Companies Act.

AIA members are eligible for membership of the Institute of Certified Public Accountants of Cyprus (ICPAC).

=== Asia ===
==== Singapore ====
In Singapore, membership of AIA is viewed as a recognised qualification for the purpose of acting as a secretary of a public company under section 171(1AA) of the Companies Act and recognized by the Singapore Ministry of Law under one of the seven recognized accountancy bodies to certify the Money Lender Act reporting requirement.

==== Hong Kong ====
AIA and the Hong Kong Institute of Certified Public Accountants (HKICPA) have signed an agreement for Mutual Examination Paper Exemption (MEPE) in 19/5/2008. The MEPE replaces the HKICPA's unilateral recognition accorded to AIA (which ceased in 30/6/2005).

==== Mainland China ====
AIA have signed an agreement with the China Association of Chief Financial Officers for AMIA certification.

AIA launched the AIA-CICPA Conversion Program in 2009 to promote internationalisation of the Chinese Institute of Certified Public Accountants (CICPA), the sole authoritative body for accountancy in mainland China. The conversion course is open to qualified CICPA members and successful candidates are eligible for direct membership of AIA.

==== India ====
AIA and the Institute of Chartered Accountants of India (ICAI) have signed a MoU for reciprocal membership arrangement. The MoU allows appropriately qualified and experienced AIA members to join the ICAI, a statutory body established under the Chartered Accountants Act, 1949 of India. (The same information is not available on ICAI official website) The MOU have lapsed in 2016.

==== Malaysia ====
The AIA professional qualification (FAIA/AAIA) is recognised by the Public Service Department of the Malaysian Government as equivalent to an Honours Degree (in Accounting field) of a Public Institution of Higher Learning. Graduates of AIA are meanwhile, recognised as having a qualification equivalent to a General Degree (in Accounting field) of a Public Institution of Higher Learning.

- The AIA certification is recognised under Section 153(3)of the Income Tax Act 1967, for purpose of registration as an Authorised Tax Agent.
- AIA members (FAIA/AAIA) are eligible for membership of The Chartered Tax Institute of Malaysia (CTIM).
- AIA members (FAIA/AAIA) are eligible for Professional Membership of The Institute of Internal Auditors Malaysia (IIA Malaysia)

=== Americas ===
==== United States ====
The Institute of Internal Auditors Inc includes the AIA membership (FAIA/AAIA) in its Professional Recognition Credit List (PRC4). Thus, AIA members are eligible for exemption for Part 4 of the Certified Internal Auditor (CIA) exam, the only globally recognised certification for internal auditors. Not recognized by the CPA Association

==== Canada ====
Not recognized for any purpose(immigration, education or work)

==== St Lucia ====
AIA is listed as a parent body for Accountants and Auditors under the Institute of Chartered Accountants of St Lucia (Incorporation) Act 1985.

==== Trinidad & Tobago ====
The Institute of Chartered Accountants of Trinidad and Tobago recognises AIA within the Schedule of Registered Societies.

==== Belize ====
AIA is listed as a scheduled society under the Accounting Profession Act Chapter 305 for membership of the Institute of Chartered Accountants of Belize.

==== Dominica ====
The Commonwealth of Dominica under its Companies Act 1994, recognises AIA as a parent body for Accountants and Auditors.

=== Africa ===
==== Ghana ====
AIA and the Institute of Chartered Accountants, Ghana (ICAG) have agreed a pathway to membership that provides a route for AIA members to join ICAG. This agreement offers members of both AIA and ICAG the opportunity to enjoy the benefits that both organisations can offer, which include increased international recognition and improved professional mobility.

To obtain ICAG membership, AIA members must demonstrate three years' relevant practical work experience in accountancy and finance, provide two referees and attend an induction programme that outlines the professional and ethical expectations of the Ghanaian Institute.

Both organisations require members to adhere to their continuing professional development policies and pay their annual subscription to maintain their membership.

==== Nigeria ====
AIA is recognized under the ANAN Act 76 of 1993 Schedule 4 for membership with the Association of National Accountants of Nigeria.

==== Mauritius ====
AIA is recognized by the National Accreditation and Equivalence Council for membership of the Mauritius Institute of Professional Accountants under the Financial Reporting Act 2004 S.51(3).

==== Uganda ====
The Accountants Act 1992 (Ch 266), recognizes AIA's eligibility for enrolment as full member of the Institute of Certified Public Accountants of Uganda.

== AIA Memberships & Student Population ==
Worldwide, AIA had 11,290 members in 2025. 'Member' means an individual who has applied for and has been admitted to membership in AIA. The figures exclude individuals who have passed their final examination and completed their training contracts but have not yet applied for membership.

Its worldwide student population was 5,207 in 2025. 'Student' means an individual who is registered with AIA as a student and is actively pursuing the education process with a view to admission to full membership.

== Council ==
- President: Shahram Moallemi
- Vice President: Philip Ford
- Vice President: Linda Richards
- Chief Executive: Philip Turnbull

== International Accountant ==
International Accountant is the designation used by fully qualified members of the AIA (AAIA or FAIA).

International Accountant is also the bi-monthly magazine published by AIA. Members receive the magazine as a membership benefit, and it is also available to subscribers. The magazine offers readers a variety of news stories which affect the profession, SME news, technical updates, and interviews with figureheads throughout the business world, as well as articles on issues such as IFRS, tax, environmental accounting, insolvency, Islamic accounting and ICT solutions.

== See also ==
- British qualified accountants
