= Counter Fraud Centre =

CIPFA Counter Fraud Centre
- Formation: 2014
- Headquarters: London
- Chief Executive (CIPFA): Rob Whiteman
- Website: www.cipfa.org/counterfraudcentre

Every year in the UK up to £49bn of public money is lost to fraud. Resources are stretched and fraudsters are increasingly sophisticated, making the public services more vulnerable than ever to criminal activity.

The Counter Fraud Centre was launched in 2014 by the Chartered Institute of Public Finance and Accountancy (CIPFA). It builds on the Institute's 130-year history of championing excellence in public finance management and is committed to helping public sector organisations prevent, detect and recover financial loss.

The centre was named in the UK Government’s 2014 Anti-Corruption plan and in the 2017-22 Anti-Corruption strategy as having a key role to play in combating corruption, both within the UK and abroad. It also conducts the definitive survey of fraud and corruption activity in local government, the annual CIPFA Fraud and Corruption Tracker (CFaCT) survey.

The centre supports the national counter fraud and anti-corruption strategy for local government, Fighting Fraud and Corruption Locally and offers training and a range of products and services that aim to measurably impact the fight against fraud in the public sector.

== See also ==
- National Audit Office (United Kingdom)
- Wales Audit Office
- Audit Scotland
- Audit Commission
