= Institute of Chartered Accountants of Scotland =

UK professional body

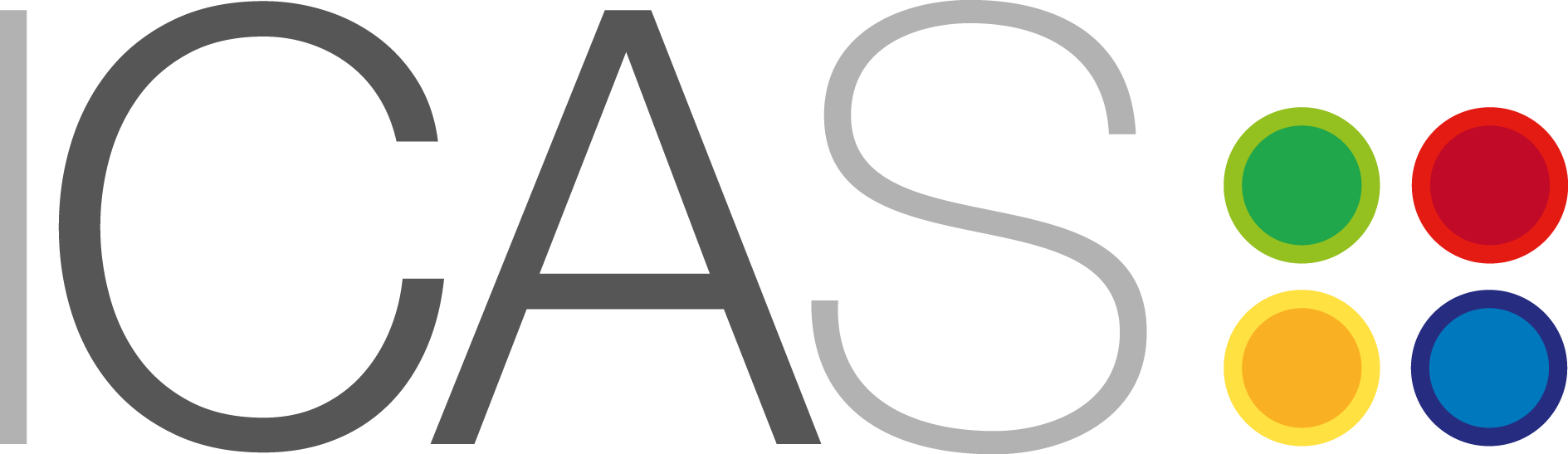
- Abbreviation: ICAS
- Predecessor: Edinburgh Society of Accountants; Glasgow Institute of Accountants and Actuaries; Aberdeen Society of Accountants
- Formation: 11 December 1854; 171 years ago
- Website: www.icas.com

The Institute of Chartered Accountants of Scotland, abbreviated as ICAS, is the world's first professional body of Chartered Accountants (CAs).

ICAS act as a voice of the professional business community. Although other British accounting bodies use the title Chartered Accountant, the CA designation is unique to ICAS in the UK.

ICAS has more than 21,000 members and students worldwide. ICAS members are business advisors, business owners and entrepreneurs. They play roles in 80% of the FTSE 100 companies. Half of ICAS members are based in Scotland; the other half work in England and around the globe.

== History ==
The Institute of Chartered Accountants of Scotland (ICAS) is the world's first professional body of accountants, receiving its Royal Charter in 1854. The institute originated from:

1. The Institute of Accountants in Edinburgh, was formed in 1853;
2. The Institute of Accountants and Actuaries in Glasgow, was formed in 1853;
3. The Aberdeen Society of Accountants, formed in 1867.

These three bodies merged to form the Institute of Chartered Accountants of Scotland in 1951. It was the first to adopt the designation "Chartered Accountant" and the designatory letters "CA" are still an exclusive privilege in the UK for ICAS members.

Anton Colella was the chief executive of the ICAS for about ten years, until retiring in 2018.

== Membership and Qualification ==
- ICAS has over 24,000 members worldwide who worked in public practice, industry, commerce, the public sector and education. Membership is generally obtained by entering a training contract with an accountancy firm (although it is possible to train within the industry), during which the student gains experience and sits a number of exams. The CA designation is reserved exclusively for their use in the UK. ICAS is the only UK chartered accountancy body that provides professional education and training, as well as examinations, for all its students.
- Since the mid-1990s, ICAS has trained students located in England & Wales, and in that respect competes with ICAEW.

In addition to the CA qualification, ICAS delivers the ICAS Tax Professional (ITP) qualification in partnership with Tolley Tax Training. Those completing the qualification are awarded the designiation 'ITP'.

== Admission to membership ==
It generally takes 3 years to qualify as a CA during which students will combine structured work experience with classroom-based study of relevant education syllabus. The training programme enables students to develop the professional knowledge, skills and attributes essential to qualify as a CA.

In order to be eligible to enter training to become a chartered accountant, prospective CA students must hold a UK degree (or overseas equivalent). The UK NARIC provides a service to individuals seeking confirmation on comparability between international qualifications and UK qualifications. In addition prospective CA students must obtain a training contract with an authorised employer.

== Mutual recognition ==
The institute has mutual recognition agreements in place with:

- Institute of Chartered Accountants in England and Wales
- Institute of Chartered Accountants in Ireland
- Canadian Institute of Chartered Accountants
- Institute of Chartered Accountants of Australia
- New Zealand Institute of Chartered Accountants
- South African Institute of Chartered Accountants
- Hong Kong Institute of Certified Public Accountants
- American Institute of Certified Public Accountants

ICAS members may be admitted to full memberships of the above institutions after passing an aptitude test or subject to other specific requirements.

Members of equivalent bodies in other European Economic Area member states and Switzerland may also be admitted to membership after passing an aptitude test, provided they are citizens of an EEA state or Switzerland.

A mutual recognition arrangement between the Institute and the Chartered Institute of Public Finance and Accountancy (CIPFA) was put in place in 1996, but was terminated by ICAS in 2005.

== Role of ICAS ==
Under the Royal Charter, ICAS works in the public interest. The objective of ICAS is to uphold the integrity and standing of the profession of chartered accountancy in the interests of society and the membership, through excellence in education and the development of accountancy and through service to members and the enforcement of professional standards.

ICAS is a Designated Professional Body under the Financial Services and Markets Act, licensing firms of CAs to conduct a range of incidental investment business activities. It is a Recognised Professional Body under the Insolvency Act that issues permits to individual CAs to conduct insolvency appointments. ICAS is also a Recognised Qualifying Body and Recognised Supervisory Body in relation to company auditing under the Companies Act 1989.

ICAS is able to authorise members to conduct audit, insolvency and investment business work in the United Kingdom, the Republic of Ireland and Luxembourg. This right is held in common with ACCA, ICAEW and the ICAI.

ICAS is a member of The Global Accounting Alliance (GAA) – an alliance of the world's leading professional accountancy bodies, which was formed in 2005. The GAA is intended to promote quality services, share information and collaborate on important international issues. It works with national regulators, governments and stakeholders, through member-body collaboration, articulation of consensus views, and working in collaboration, where possible with other international bodies, especially IFAC.

ICAS is a founding member of Chartered Accountants Worldwide (CAW), an initiative by the leading chartered institutes to support, develop and promote the vital role that chartered accountants play throughout the global economy. It creates a community of hundreds of thousands of chartered accountants and students who share a commitment to the highest standards of professional and ethical practice.

== Disciplinary process ==
ICAS was hesitant to join the Accountancy & Actuarial Discipline Board when it was first set up (as the AIDB), but joined after approval by a special general meeting in October 2004.

The AADB only hears matters considered to be in the public interest. The institute conducts its own hearings into less substantial allegations. These used to be held in private, but ICAS resolved at a further special meeting in 2009 to follow the example of other bodies such as ICAEW to make the hearings public.

== See also ==
- British qualified accountants
