= Chartered Accountant of Singapore =

Professional qualification in Singapore

- Location: Singapore
- Services: Accounting and Finance
- Website: Official website

Chartered Accountant of Singapore is a professional accounting qualification in Singapore. Candidates who successfully complete the Singapore Qualification Programme in Accounting are eligible to register as Chartered Accountants of Singapore under the Singapore Accountancy Commission Act 2013.
