= Institute of Certified Public Accountants in Ireland =

Irish accountancy body

CPA Ireland
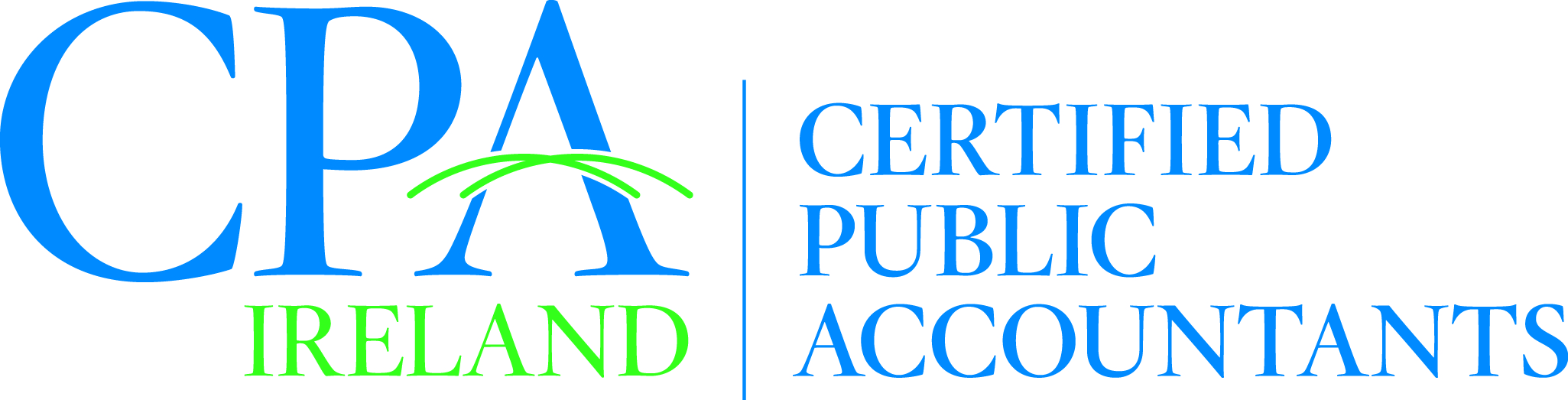
- Abbreviation: CPA Ireland
- Formation: 11 March 1926; 100 years ago
- Legal status: Company limited by guarantee
- Headquarters: Dublin, Ireland
- Region served: Republic of Ireland and Northern Ireland
- Members: c. 4,000
- President: Aine Collins
- Students: c. 1,000
- Website: www.cpaireland.ie

CPA Ireland, formerly the Institute of Certified Public Accountants in Ireland, is one of the main Irish accountancy bodies, with 5,000 members and students.

The Certified Public Accountants (CPA) designation is the most commonly used designation for professional accountants. One million qualified accountants worldwide are CPAs. CPA Ireland was founded in 1926 and its members work in accountancy firms, the public sector, the financial services, and other private sector businesses.

CPA Ireland is a member of the Consultative Committee of Accountancy Bodies – Ireland (CCAB–I), a founding member of the International Federation of Accountants (IFAC), and a member of the Fédération des Experts Comptables Européens (FEE), the representative organisation for the profession in Europe. The CPA Ireland headquarters are based in Dublin.

== History of CPA Ireland ==
CPA Ireland was founded as the Irish Association of Accountants on 11 March 1926 and then went on to join with the Irish Society of Public Accountants, originally incorporated 29 January 1943. This amalgamation, in 1964, blended the two bodies to become the CPA Ireland there is today. The first CPA exams for election to membership were held in November 1926 and CPA Ireland today represents 5000 members and students.

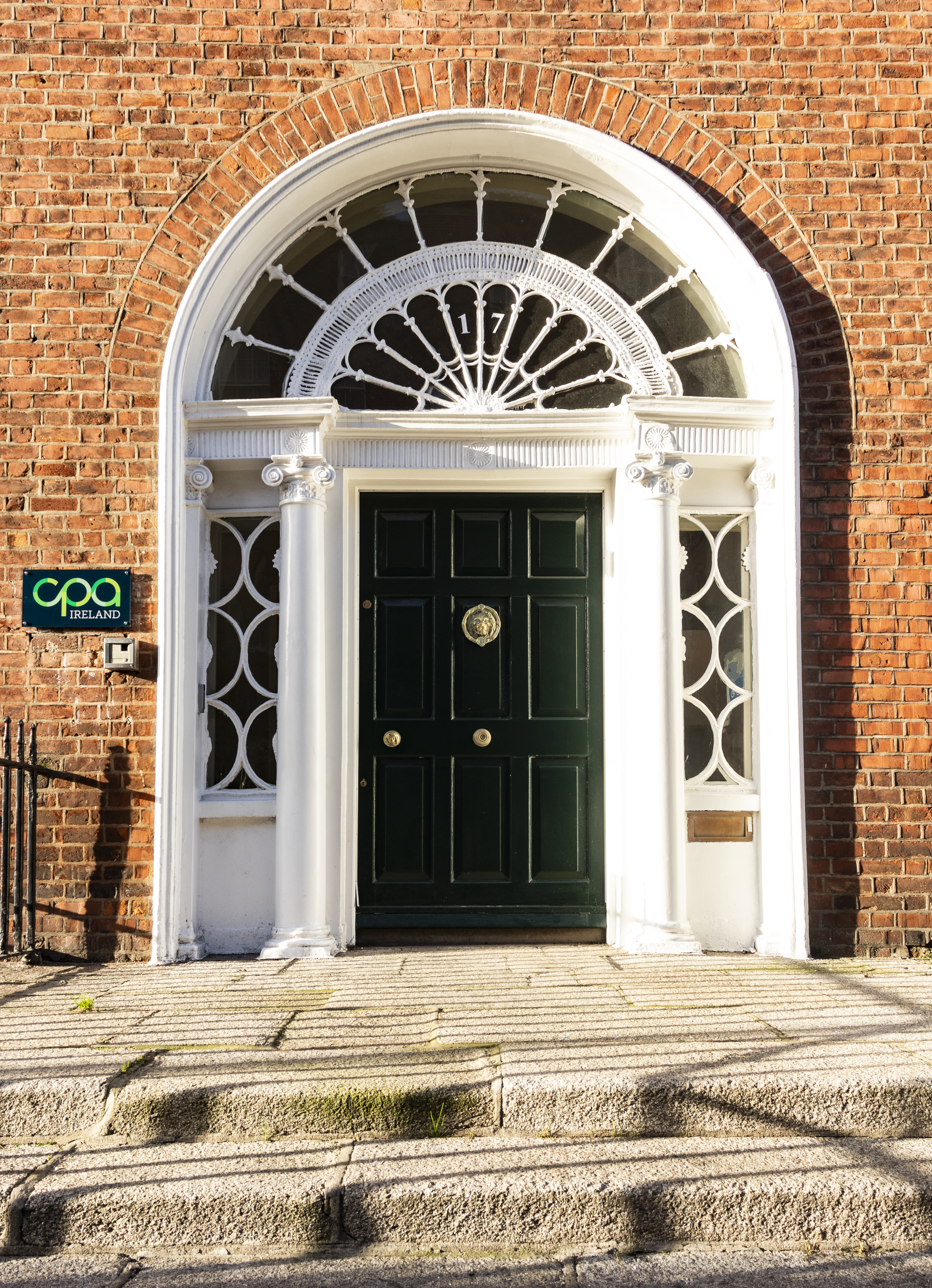
CPA Ireland Headquarters in Dublin.

In 1961 the Society of Public Accountants gained legal recognition and changed its name to The Irish Society of Certified Public Accountants Ltd; this was changed again in 1971 to The Institute of Certified Public Accountants in Ireland.

== Council of the Institute ==
The council of the institute is made up of 16 elected members and up to three non-members, including the president and vice presidents of the institute. The council meets approximately eight times a year to set policy on areas like the regulation of members in the public interest, the growth and development of the institute and examination and training standards.

The office-holders for 2022 are:

- Aine Collins (President)
- Mark Gargan (vice president)
- Clodagh Henehan (Vice President)

== Qualification ==
Students do not need a business or accountancy-related degree to become an accountant; CPA students include school-leavers, mature students and graduates. Previous qualifications may entitle students to exemptions.

There are four stages of examinations with the CPA Institute: Formation 1 and 2 and Professional 1 and 2.

Students must complete three years of training to apply for membership of the CPA. Training can take place in practice, industry or both. Students may first study for the CPA exams and obtain the required training at a later date.

=== Practice ===
CPA Members who wish to engage in public practice must hold a practising certificate, which requires completion of a Practice Orientation Course and examination, and two years' experience in their intended practice area after admission to membership.

=== Audit ===
To be eligible to act as an auditor, CPA members must hold an audit certificate, requiring a practising certificate and an audit qualification. To obtain this, members must have three years' experience supervised by a registered auditor.

== Role ==
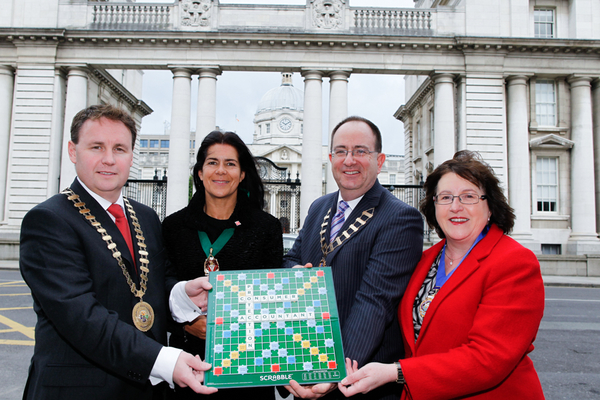
Irish Accountancy Bodies lobby for protection of the term 'accountant', from left to right: Cormac Fitzgerald (CPA Ireland), Anne Keogh (ACCA), Brendan Lenihan (Chartered Accountants Ireland) and Louise Connaughton (CIMA).

As CPA Ireland is a recognised body, it has a statutory obligation to oversee the professional activities of its members in practice, ensuring that education and training standards are maintained.

"The role of the institute is to:

- regulate CPAs in accordance with the law and the institute's code of ethics in the public interest,
- ensure that CPAs are constantly up to date in all matters relating to their professional work,
- maintain the highest levels of educational standards for new entrants to the profession, and
- represent the interests of our members where appropriate."

== Mutual recognition ==
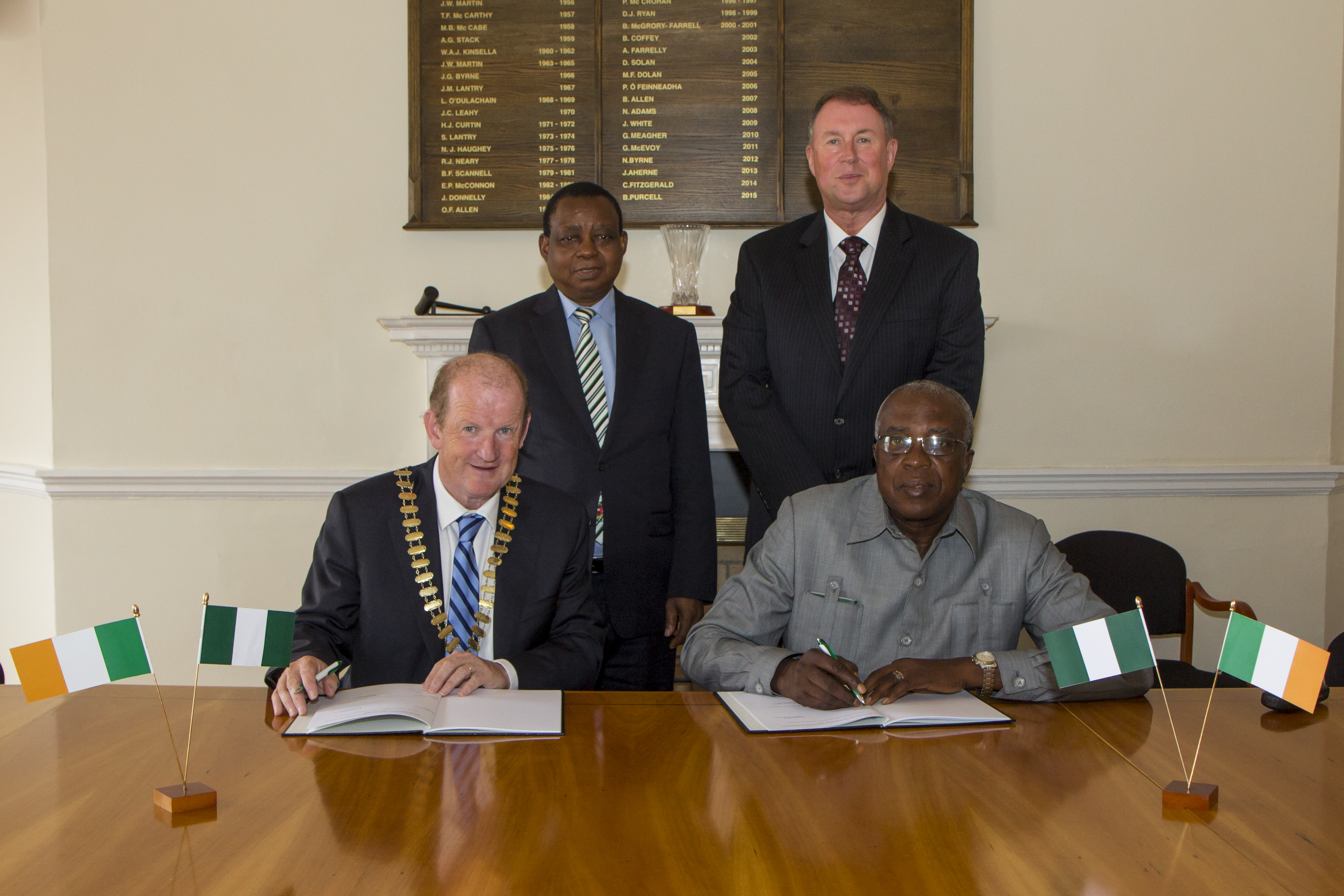
CPA Ireland and the Association of National Accountants of Nigeria enter strategic partnership

CPA Ireland members work in over 40 countries. CPA Ireland has mutual recognition agreements (MRAs) with CPA Australia,ICA India, ICA Bangladesh and CGA Canada, South African Institute of Professional Accountants (SAIPA), the Association of National Accountants of Nigeria (ANAN) and Institute of Cost and Management Accountants of Pakistan (ICMA Pakistan).

In 2022, CPA Ireland signed a mutual recognition agreement with the American Institute of CPA's (AICPA). The MRA will provide an abbreviated qualification pathway for eligible accounting professionals in the U.S. and Ireland to practice in the partner countries.

== Memorandums of Understanding ==
The institute has memorandums of understanding (MOU) with CPA Sri Lanka, CPA Bulgaria, and The Chartered Institute of Management Accountants (CIMA) giving CPA Ireland Members access to the Chartered Global Management Accountant (CGMA) designation.

CPA Ireland has Memorandums of Understanding with CPA Rwanda, CPA Zimbabwe and the Lithuanian Chamber of Auditors and is recognised as an approved body of auditors in New Zealand.

== World Bank Contracts ==
In 2011, CPA Ireland was awarded two World Bank contracts worth $1.5 million to develop the accountancy profession in Rwanda and Mozambique.

== See also ==
- Certified Public Accountant
