= Institute of Chartered Accountants in England and Wales =

UK professional organisation

- Abbreviation: ICAEW
- Predecessor: Incorporated Society of Liverpool Accountants, Institute of Accountants in London and three others
- Formation: 11 May 1880; 146 years ago
- Legal status: Chartered body
- Headquarters: London, EC2
- Members: 211,600 members and students
- President: Caroline Smale
- Deputy President: Rob Tindle
- Vice President: Neil Cutting
- Chief Executive: Alan Vallance
- Board of directors: Chair of the Board: Peter Wyman
- Website: icaew.com

The Institute of Chartered Accountants in England and Wales (ICAEW) is a professional membership organisation that promotes, develops and supports chartered accountants and students around the world. As of December 2025, it has over 211,600 members and students in 150 countries. ICAEW was established by Royal Charter in 1880.

== Overview ==
ICAEW works with governments, regulators and business leaders globally and supervises more than 11,500 firms, along with all ICAEW members and students, holding them to standards of professional competency and conduct.

ICAEW has two offices in the UK; at their headquarters, Chartered Accountants' Hall in Moorgate, London and in Central Milton Keynes at the Hub:MK complex. It also has offices in Belgium, China (Beijing, Shanghai), Hong Kong SAR, Indonesia, Vietnam (Ha Noi, Ho Chi Minh), Malaysia, Singapore and the United Arab Emirates (Middle East, Africa and South East Asia Region).

ICAEW is also a member of the Consultative Committee of Accountancy Bodies (CCAB), formed in 1974 by the major accountancy professional bodies in the UK and Ireland. The fragmented nature of the accountancy profession in the UK is in part due to the absence of any legal requirement for an accountant to be a member of one of the many institutes, as the term accountant does not have legal protection. However, a person must belong to ICAEW, ICAS or CAI to call themselves a chartered accountant in the UK (although there are other chartered bodies of British qualified accountants whose members are likewise authorised to conduct restricted work such as auditing).

ICAEW is a founder member of Chartered Accountants Worldwide (CAW), an international network of accountancy bodies which represents over 1.8 million members and students in more than 190 countries. It is also one of the founding members of the Global Accounting Alliance (GAA), a forum for 10 of the world's leading professional accountancy bodies whose members practise in major capital markets.

== History ==
Until the mid-nineteenth century, the role of accountants in England and Wales was restricted to that of bookkeepers, in that accountants merely maintained records of what other business people had purchased and sold. However, with the growth of the limited liability company and large scale manufacturing and logistic in Victorian Britain, a demand was created for more technically proficient accountants to deal with the increasing complexity of accounting transactions dealing with depreciation of assets, inventory valuation and the Companies legislation being introduced.

To improve their status and combat criticism of low standards, accountants in the cities of Britain formed professional bodies. ICAEW was formed from the five of these associations that existed in England prior to its establishment by royal charter in May 1880.

1. The Incorporated Society of Liverpool Accountants, formed in January 1870;
2. The Institute of Accountants in London was formed in November 1870, comprising 37 members under the leadership of William Quilter. In 1871, standards for membership were established with new members having to show knowledge and aptitude through successfully passing an oral examination. Initially the London Institute restricted its membership to that city, but as other institutes were established elsewhere (for example, in Manchester and Sheffield) it was decided to remove this restriction and as such in 1872 it simply became known as the Institute of Accountants to reflect its new national coverage;
3. The Manchester Institute of Accountants, formed in February 1871;
4. The Society of Accountants in England (1872);
5. The Sheffield Institute of Accountants (1877).

In 1920, following the Sex Disqualification (Removal) Act 1919, the organisation admitted Mary Harris Smith, who, at the age of 75 and after numerous applications, became the first woman chartered accountant in the world. In 2020, as part of their celebrations to mark 100 years of female chartered accountants, ICAEW announced the commissioning of a blue plaque to honour Mary Harris Smith.

The headquarters of ICAEW, Chartered Accountants' Hall, in the City of London, was designed in the Italian Renaissance style by John Belcher and built by Colls & Sons. Completed in 1892, it is widely regarded as one of the finest examples of Victorian Baroque architecture. Sir William Whitfield designed the 1964–70 extension and new entrance.

In 1948, ICAEW received a Supplemental Charter. In 1957, ICAEW merged with the Society of Incorporated Accountants (founded in 1885 as the Society of Incorporated Accountants and Auditors).

== Membership and qualifications ==
In order to become an ICAEW Chartered Accountant, each student must pass the ACA qualification, one of the most advanced learning and professional development programmes available.

=== ACA qualification ===
The ACA comprises three core elements that must be successfully completed: business, finance and accountancy exams; professional skills and experience; and Specialised Learning. Integrated into each element are the key themes of sustainability, technology and ethics.

Students must be in a training agreement with an ICAEW Authorised Training Employer. This ensures they receive invaluable business and commercial insight by putting what they learn into practice, completing a minimum of 450 days professional experience.

Specialised Learning enables students to tailor their learning to their individual development needs, completing a minimum of 30 units (each one roughly an hour) of Specialised Learning from a wide range of interactive e-learning content.

=== ACA exams ===
There are 14 exams which are all computer based, spread across the Certificate, Professional and Advanced Levels. Certificate Level exams can be taken at any time either at a dedicated test centre or at the candidate's own location via remote invigilation. The Professional Level exams take place four times a year and students can take them at a test centre or via remote invigilation. Advanced Level exams including case study take place twice a year. Again, students can take them at a test centre or via remote invigilation.

=== Other ways to membership and affiliations ===
Members of a Professional Accountancy Education Europe body can apply for ICAEW membership without having to meet further examination of experience requirements.

ICAEW's "Pathways to Membership" programme, allows fully qualified members from certain professional bodies to apply for membership based on their experience.

There are also various other routes to membership, including reciprocal arrangements, advanced credit arrangements and common content arrangements with other professional accountancy bodies around the world.

=== Membership categories ===
Members have the designation ACA (Associate Chartered Accountant) or FCA (Fellow Chartered Accountant) after their name.

Fellowship is intended to designate those who have achieved a higher level of professional experience. It is awarded on application, and at no additional cost, to those members who have attained at least ten years of membership and who, at the date of application, have complied with the institute's requirements on continuing professional development in the preceding three years and have no outstanding disciplinary charges against them.

== Regulation and discipline ==
As an improvement regulator, ICAEW works to protect the public by making sure ICAEW Chartered Accountants, firms that are regulated by ICAEW and students studying with ICAEW maintain the highest standards of professional competency and conduct. An improvement regulator works to educate as well as monitor the quality of its firms and members’ work and enforce change (change can include restrictions, penalties, exclusion from membership or from working in a regulated area) when needed. To ensure impartiality, the regulatory and disciplinary roles of ICAEW are carried out by a separate department, the Professional Standards Department. All of this work is overseen by several layers of independent governance; an independent board, the (IRB) and regulatory and disciplinary committees (at least half of each board must be lay members (non-accountants)) and oversight bodies including the Financial Reporting Council and the Insolvency Service.

== Faculties ==
ICAEW has seven faculties, each run by an in-house team working together with members who are experts in their particular sector:

1. Audit and Assurance
2. Corporate Finance
3. Corporate Reporting
4. Financial Services: Banking
5. Financial Services: Insurance
6. Financial Services: Investment Management
7. Tax

The Tax Faculty was the first to be formed in 1990. The monthly TAXline publication started in 1991, and an annual Technical Review (now Tax Planning) was first published in October 1992. The Tax Faculty joined the Confédération Fiscale Européenne (CFE) in 2001.

== Student Societies ==
There are 26 UK Students’ societies, some of which have existed for over 100 years, as well as international student networks. Further information can be found here.

The work of the student societies is key to encouraging the active engagement of ACA students with ICAEW at a local level. More specifically, this is achieved by:

- Advancing members’ education continuously.
- Acting as a channel of communication between students, ICAEW, the Student Council, and any other relevant bodies.
- Providing opportunities for networking, which enable students to develop intellectually, socially and professionally.

The student societies run a range of programmes and activity over the course of a year all of which complement the students’ ACA studies.

Events and activities are varied and typically cover revision sessions, career development seminars and a range of networking events such as annual dinners and quiz nights.

The ICAEW Student Council (ISC) is the representative body for student societies, bringing together representatives from each of the student societies to provide a voice and a feedback mechanism for the students.

== See also ==
- British qualified accountants
