= Certified Public Accountants Association =

Organization of the United Kingdom

- Abbreviation: CPAA
- Formation: 1997; 29 years ago England, UK
- Headquarters: Unit F Lostock Office Park, Lynstock Way, Lostock, Bolton BL6 4SG, United Kingdom
- Region served: UK; Overseas
- Members: > 1,300
- Staff: 14
- Website: www.cpaa.co.uk
- Formerly called: Association of Certified Public Accountants

The Certified Public Accountants Association (CPAA) (formerly Association of Certified Public Accountants and UKCPA) was formed in 1989 to represent the interests of certain accountants in the United Kingdom.

The association's National Administration Centre and head office are in Bolton, England.

== Qualification ==
CPAA offers the designations of Certified Public Accountant (ACPA or FCPA). The American CPA Institute is the main accounting qualification in the United States; there are also many CPAs in China, Australia, and elsewhere. CPAA was founded in 1989 to offer a British version.

The association admits members based on either their existing professional accounting body memberships, accountancy qualifications, or experience. As of April 2015 it was pursuing Ofqual recognition as an awarding body; a 2018 document stated that by 2022 it could begin preparations for an application to Ofqual. Entry requirements include membership of a member body recognised by the International Federation of Accountants and completion of a practical assessment of their work.

Members wishing to use the designation Certified Public Accountant, or the designatory letters ACPA/ FCPA, in connection with offering services as a practising public accountant to the general public/business community, must be in possession of a valid, current practising certificate. For a firm to use the designation Certified Public Accountant(s), all the partners or directors/shareholders must be members of the association and the principal must hold a current practising certificate.

Since 2015, CPAA has been recognised as a body whose members are permitted to act as Independent Examiners of accounts for charities in England and Wales.
