= Chartered Institute of Management Accountants =

UK-based professional accounting body

Chartered Institute of Management Accountants (CIMA)
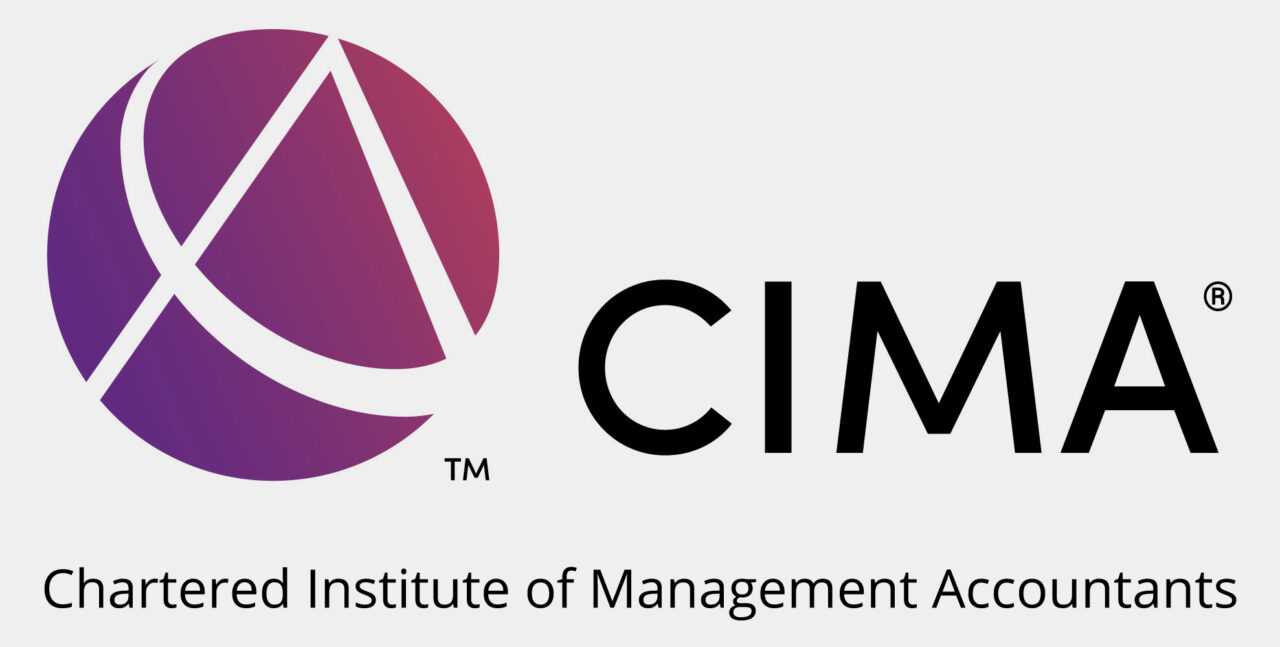
- Abbreviation: CIMA
- Predecessor: The Institute of Cost and Management Accountants
- Formation: March 1919; 107 years ago
- Legal status: Chartered body
- Headquarters: London EC2; United Kingdom
- Coordinates: 51°31′10.4874″N 0°5′13.1994″W
- Members: 115,000 (2020)
- President: Simon Bittlestone, FCMA, CGMA
- Deputy President: John Graham, FCMA, CGMA
- CEO: Andrew Harding
- Affiliations: Association of International Certified Professional Accountants
- Revenue: ▼US$361.37 million (2020, including AICPA)
- Expenses: ▼US$324.89 million (2020, including AICPA)
- Website: www.aicpa-cima.com www.cimastudy.com
- Formerly called: Institute of Costs and Works Accountants

The Chartered Institute of Management Accountants (CIMA) is a global professional management accounting body, based in the United Kingdom. CIMA offers training and qualification in management accounting and related subjects. It is focused on accountants working in industry and provides ongoing support and training for members.

CIMA is one of the professional associations for accountants in the UK and Ireland. Its particular emphasis is on developing the management accounting profession. CIMA is the largest and the oldest management accounting body in the world, with over 229,000 members and students worldwide.

The Chartered Global Management Accountant (CGMA) qualification has the academic standing of a master's degree in the UK (recognised at Level 7 by NARIC).

== History ==
CIMA was formed in March 1919, as the Institute of Cost and Works Accountants, by a group of legal professionals and businessmen who wanted to develop an approach to accounting that would meet the demands of a rapidly changing business world. Industrialisation had led to large scale, complex businesses providing unprecedented challenges in management. Employers needed a new form of in-house accountant to provide, in addition to accounts, better analysis of cost and of operations to inform performance management. The new institute soon gained the backing of leading industrialists including, Lord Leverhulme who became its president.

Advances in technology and globalisation made business ever more complex over the 20th century and the role of the accountant in business became more significant. It expanded to include provision of a wider range of information and the emphasis shifted from accounting to management.

The status of management accounting as a distinct branch of the accounting profession was recognised by the granting of a Royal charter in 1975.

== Activities ==
CIMA operates a standard scheme of qualifying examinations for prospective members. It promotes local education, training and management development operations, and new techniques through its research foundation and the dissemination of management accounting practices through publications and other media related activities. It publishes a monthly journal, supplied free to members and registered students, called 'Financial Management'.

CIMA is recognised as a professional accounting body for various statutory purposes by UK and various overseas governments. The institute regulates the activities of its members by a code of practice, a discipline committee and a continuing professional development education scheme. Its governing body is its council, comprising members elected from regional branches. Each of the branches has a committee and is responsible for much of the 'grass roots' activity. Activity such as qualification development is undertaken from the London head office.

In 2011, CIMA left the Consultative Committee of Accountancy Bodies (CCAB) over fees dispute—the proportion of fees it pays to the UK audit regulator Financial Reporting Council (FRC).

In 2012, CIMA and the American Institute of Certified Public Accountants created the CGMA designation (Chartered Global Management Accountant). The designation recognises the most talented and committed management accountants. The CGMA is the most widely held management accounting designation in the world with more than 150,000 designees; it is educationally equivalent to a master's degree. The designation is built on extensive global research to maintain the highest relevance with employers and develop the competencies most in demand. CGMA professionals are business strategists who can link the board's objectives with those of organisation's, guiding critical business decisions and creating sustainable business success.

In 2014, CIMA, with the American Institute of Certified Public Accountants, launched the Global Management Accounting Principles. The Principles were endorsed by UK business leaders including Ian King, Chief Executive, BAE Systems and Howard Orme, Director General, Finance & Commercial, Department for Business Innovation & Skills. The CGMA Competency Framework was also launched in 2014. The framework shows the range of technical, accounting and finance skills that management accountants need to do their jobs and consists of four knowledge areas: Technical Skills, Business Skills, People Skills and Leadership Skills, all underpinned by Ethics, Integrity and Professionalism.

In 2016, CIMA sponsored the creation of the world's first management accounting standard: Guide to management accounting principles. The standard, published by the British Standards Institute codifies a universal framework for best practice in decision making. Organisations including Sky, The Environment Agency, Fujitsu, the NHS and Siemens had input into its development. It is designed as a best-practice guide to management accounting, allowing organisations to benchmark their finance function and unlock the full contribution that management accountancy can make. The specification is based on the Global Management Accounting Principles, created in 2014 by CIMA and the American Institute of Certified Public Accountants.

In 2017, members of CIMA and the American Institute of Certified Public Accountants (AICPA) formed the Association of International Certified Professional Accountants to unite and strengthen the accounting profession globally.

== Membership ==
CIMA has two grades of full membership:

- Associate – designated by the letters ACMA
- Fellow – designated by the letters FCMA

A CIMA Associate or Fellow is permitted to use the suffix letters ACMA or FCMA together with CGMA (Chartered Global Management Accountant) after their name.

To be admitted as an Associate, a candidate must have:

- completed a period of qualifying practice of at least three years, documented and signed by appropriate witnesses,
- passed the institute's 16 qualifying examinations (or have a verified exemption), including 3 integrated case study exams under 2019 syllabus.

To become a Fellow, a candidate ACMA must, in addition, have appropriate experience at a senior level.

In the past, CIMA has offered forms of association that do not amount to full membership, for example, an "Affiliate" membership class was promoted in the 1970s.

== Strategic alliances ==
CIMA members have access to a number of strategic alliances, including:

- An accelerated route to Associateship of the Association of Corporate Treasurers
- A mutual recognition agreement with the Society of Management Accountants of Canada
- A mutual recognition agreement with CPA Australia
- A recognition agreement with CPA Ireland
- A strategic alliance with the Institute of Chartered Accountants of Australia
- On 26 September 2006, CIMA announced a joint qualification program with the New Zealand Institute of Chartered Accountants
- Memorandum of understanding with the Institute of Cost Accountants of India
- Strategic Alliance with the Institute of Cost and Management Accountants of Pakistan (ICMAP)
- A joint venture with the American Institute of Certified Public Accountants to establish and promote a new, internationally recognised designation for management accounting — the Chartered Global Management Accountant (CGMA).
- Recognition from the South African Institute of Chartered Accountants
- An accelerated route to the CGMA designation for members of the Chartered Institute of Public Finance and Accountancy (CIPFA)
- An accelerated route to the CGMA designation for members of the Institute of Chartered Accountants, Ghana (ICAG)
- Memorandum of understanding with CPA Canada: Upon passing day 2 and day 3 of the Common Final Examination, CIMA members are eligible to apply for the CPA designation.

== See also ==
- British qualified accountants
