= Irish Auditing and Accounting Supervisory Authority =

- Údarás Maoirseachta Iniúchta agus Cuntasaíochta na hÉireann

Statutory office overview
- Formed: 2003
- Jurisdiction: Government of Ireland
- Statutory office executives: Kevin Prendergast, Chief executive; Aisling Kennedy, Chairperson
- Parent department: Department of Enterprise, Tourism and Employment
- Website: iaasa.ie

The Irish Auditing and Accounting Supervisory Authority (IAASA) (Irish: Údarás Maoirseachta Iniúchta agus Cuntasaíochta na hÉireann) is the government body in charge of supervising and regulating accounting and auditing in the Republic of Ireland. It was created by statute as a state company in 2003.

== History ==
The agency was established by the Companies (Auditing and Accounting) Act 2003. The act defined the authority's role as the supervision of prescribed accountancy bodies, the promotion of high professional standards in accountancy and auditing, the monitoring of certain companies for compliance with the act, the oversight of statutory auditing, and the provision of advice to the Minister for Enterprise, Trade and Employment. The authority is also empowered to recognise accountancy bodies in Ireland. Before the 2003 Act, independent accountancy bodies had no external oversight over the proceedings and membership.

The authority assumed direct responsibility for supervising the audits of public interest entities, including banks, insurers and publicly traded companies after the passing of the European Union (Statutory Audits) Regulations 2016. This responsibility includes issuing fines and reprimands. Since 2020, the authority has published the results of these audits.

The authority may apply to the High Court for declarations of non-compliance and remedial orders for companies that fail to comply with the 2003 Act.

The authority's membership includes prescribed accountancy bodies, the Director of Corporate Enforcement, the Revenue Commissioners, the Central Bank of Ireland, and the Irish Stock Exchange. The authority is governed by a board of no more than nine directors. The accountancy bodies, other designated bodies, and the Minister for Enterprise, Tourism and Employment may each nominate two directors to the board. At present, the chief executive is Kevin Prendergast and the chair of the board is Aisling Kennedy. It has an estimated budget of €5 million drawn from the Central Fund and fees paid by the accountancy bodies.

== See also ==
- List of financial supervisory authorities by country
