= Chartered Institute of Public Finance and Accountancy =

UK-based professional association

- Formation: 1885; 141 years ago
- Headquarters: London
- Members: 14,000
- President: Carol Culley
- Chief Executive: Owen Mapley
- Website: www.cipfa.org

The Chartered Institute of Public Finance and Accountancy (CIPFA) is a UK based organisation for accountants who work in the public sector, accounting firms and other professional bodies where management of public funds are required. CIPFA is the only UK professional accountancy organisation who is dedicated to public financial management. They currently have approximately 14,000 members. They offer qualifications including a professional qualification for public sector accountants as well as a postgraduate diploma for people already working in management.

CIPFA is a member of the Consultative Committee of Accountancy Bodies, the umbrella organisation for the British accountancy profession. It also belongs to the International Federation of Accountants.

CIPFA's regional branches cover the Channel Islands, Europe, Midlands, North East, North West & North Wales, Northern Ireland, Republic of Ireland, Scotland, South East, South West & South Wales and Yorkshire & the Humber.

== Designation ==
Members of CIPFA are entitled to style themselves "Chartered Public Finance Accountant" and use the designatory letters "CPFA". Members who have been elected as Fellow Members can call themselves "Fellow of the Chartered Institute of Public Finance and Accountancy" and use the abbreviation "FCPFA".

== History ==
CIPFA began life as the Corporate Treasurers' and Accountants' Institute in 1885, which was later renamed the Institute of Municipal Treasurers and Accountants (IMTA) in 1901. This later became the Chartered Institute of Public Finance and Accountancy (CIPFA) in 1973 when it obtained its Royal Charter.

== Qualifications ==
CIPFA offers a range of qualifications; the "Professional Qualification" is intended for those working in and with public services in the UK. For people outside of the UK there are some International Public Financial Management qualifications; a "Certificate in Charity Finance & Accountancy"; and a "CIPFA Certificate Investigative Practice Qualification" aimed primarily at investigators who have some experience but who lack any formal qualification.

== Membership ==
CIPFA students who have successfully completed the CIPFA Professional Accountancy Qualification and their Practical Experience Portfolio (PEP) are invited to apply for CIPFA Membership. Once membership is approved members can use the designatory letters ‘CPFA’ (Chartered Public Finance Accountant) for as long as they continue membership.

Further routes to membership are available, for example for those with some accountancy qualifications but who must top-up with CIPFA qualifications. There are also arrangements in place with various other professional accountancy organisations where membership, by examination, of these bodies and an appropriate number of years experience in public finance will be regarded as suitable to progress to membership of CIPFA.

== Mutual recognition ==
CIPFA and the Society of Management Accountants of Canada signed a mutual recognition agreement in February 2004.

=== CMA/CIPFA dual qualification and designations ===
CIPFA and CMA Canada have a dual qualification which provides Canadian public sector employees with comprehensive financial management and leadership training.

On completing the programme, candidates can apply for dual public finance management and accounting designations as a Chartered Public Finance Accountant (CPFA) and Certified Management Accountant (CMA) from CIPFA and CMA Canada respectively.

CIPFA and CPA Australia signed a mutual recognition agreement in June 2007.

Although not strictly a form of mutual recognition, CIPFA members of 5 years standing may apply for direct entry to the Institute of Chartered Accountants in England and Wales subject to meeting certain criteria.

== CIPFA Group ==
The CIPFA Group includes, in addition to the main accounting body; Public Finance - a monthly magazine for the public sector; the in-house CIPFA Education and Training Centre with almost 3,000 students at locations across the UK, and works with other places of learning to provide courses locally; and a commercial services arm which provided advice and services for the public sector. They include information and guidance, courses and conferences, property and asset management solutions, consultancy and interim people for a range of public sector clients.

== See also ==
- CIPFA Counter Fraud Centre
