= Chartered Accountants Ireland =

Irish professional body

Coordinates: 53.344198°N 6.248279°W

- Abbreviation: Chartered Accountants Ireland
- Formation: 26 May 1888; 138 years ago
- Type: Chartered body
- Headquarters: Dublin
- Members: 40,000
- President: Joan Curry
- Chief Executive: Rosemary Keogh
- Website: charteredaccountants.ie

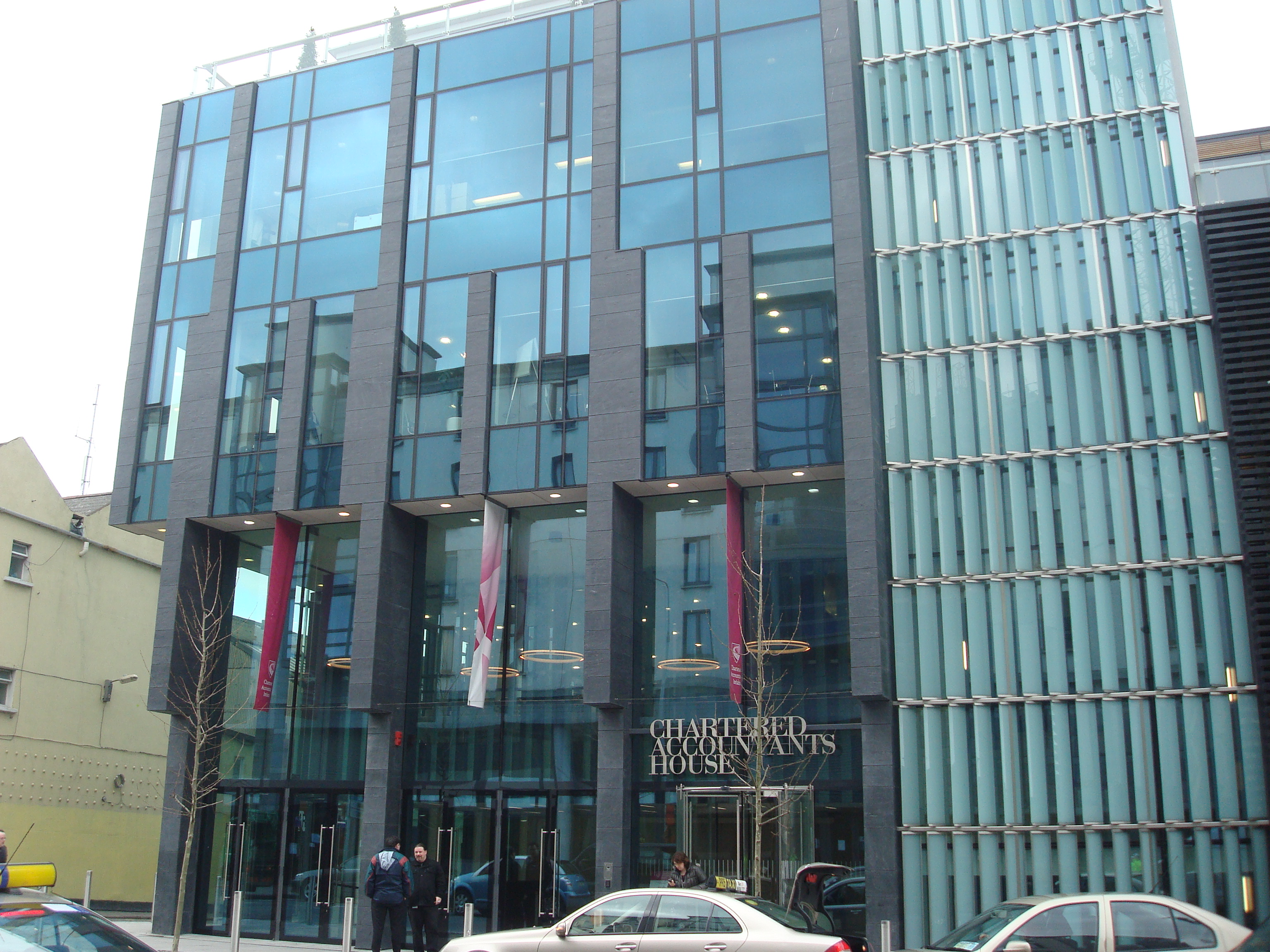
Chartered Accountants House, Pearse Street

Chartered Accountants Ireland was established by Royal Charter on 14 May 1888, and is Ireland's largest accountancy body. According to its website, it represents over 40,000 members globally.

Chartered Accountants Ireland is part of the Consultative Committee of Accountancy Bodies and members are authorised to conduct audit, insolvency and investment business work. It is one of Ireland's six Recognised Accounting Bodies, regulated by the Irish Auditing and Accounting Supervisory Authority (IAASA).

Chartered Accountants Ireland is a founding member of the chartered accountants body, Chartered Accountants Worldwide.

== History ==
Chartered Accountants Ireland was established under a royal charter in 1888. This original body was named the 'Institute of Chartered Accountants in Ireland'. The body has been a member of the International Federation of Accountants since 1977.

== Organisation ==
The council is the highest governance organ of the institute. It determines strategy and policy, and consists of 23 members. The bye-laws provide for a geographical spread of council members between the Republic of Ireland, Northern Ireland and Great Britain and for a balance between members in practice and members in business.

Chartered Accountants Ireland supports six district societies in Ireland (Ulster, Leinster, Cork, Mid-West, Western, North-West), one in London and one in Australia (Sydney) and one in the USA.

== Operation ==
=== Commentary ===
Representative of Chartered Accountants Ireland sometimes comment on matters such as foreign direct investment, Corporate Social Responsibility, insolvency, taxation, NAMA, budget announcements, and other matters.

=== Enquiries ===
In 2007 the Chartered Accountants Regulatory Board was established to develop Standards of Professional Conduct and to supervise the compliance of members, member firms, affiliates and students. They initiated an investigation into the "circumstances around the issue of inappropriate directors' loans at Anglo Irish Bank" and into the performance of Ernst and Young. In 2009, independent Senator Shane Ross said the Institute "ranks with the Central Bank of Ireland as the winner of the wooden spoon for watchdogs". The first Chairman of the Regulatory Board, had companies he is a director of, fined a total of €3.35 million by the Central Bank of Ireland, for risk control and reporting failures.

In 2009 Chartered Accountants House on Pearse St., was officially opened by President McAleese, with new resources for its members and conferencing facilities.

An external inquiry team in February 2010 found that the institute's complaints committee had a prima facie case to answer for the conduct of its proceedings and there were further apparent flaws in the accountancy body's disciplinary procedures.

The Irish Times, the country's newspaper of record, in April 2010 raised questions about the role of Institute Members in relation to the crisis affecting the banking sector and an insurance company. Within days, an opinion piece in the respected Sunday Business Post said "what a glorious contribution that body of super-chargers made to the collapse of business and of the entire financial system here and how they have got away with it".

The Irish Auditing and Accounting Supervisory Authority (IAASA), the independent body entrusted with overseeing corporate governance in the accountancy profession, in November 2010, fined the Institute of Chartered Accountants €10,000. It described the Chartered Accountants Ireland's complaints committee's behaviour as a "substantive failure and not merely a technical" one.

The next week in November 2010, it was announced that the policing of audits of publicly quoted companies is being taken out of the hands of professional accounting bodies and transferred to the state's auditing watchdog. The move of the role to an independent, state-run body is seen as a more stringent approach to enforcing audit standards. This follows on from an EU recommendation that member states needed to ‘'up their game'’ in the monitoring of public interest bodies.

The next month Irish accountancy firms and auditors who worked with the Irish banks during the previous three years were barred from doing key stress tests on behalf of the Central Bank of Ireland and the International Monetary Fund.

The Director of Corporate Enforcement, Paul Appleby, in February 2011 said, there were grounds for questioning "the consistency and quality of audit work within the profession". Mr Appleby also said auditors "report surprisingly few types of company law offences to us", with the so-called "big four" auditing firms reporting the least often to his office, at just 5pc of all reports. He had taken issue on "numerous occasions" with the quality of audit work and audit reports issued by accountants. "Occasionally, this has resulted in admissions of lapses, and where appropriate, in revised audit reports being issued." At the same time, the Revenue Commissioners said "that current audits said little about the business model of firms or their liquidity position".

The state's auditing watchdog warned Irish listed companies that it wants to see better financial reporting in 2011, after stating that it has been "disappointed" by Irish plcs.

A March 2011 report into the Irish banking collapse criticised the role of external auditors in failing to identify and warn of the risky lending practices being adopted by Irish banks. It said auditors took a narrow interpretation of their job description and remained "silent" during the excesses of the boom. It found the external auditors of the main Irish banks consistently failed to report "excesses over prudential sector lending limits" to the Central Bank of Ireland.

In July 2011, the Chartered Accountants Regulatory Board was fined a record €110,000 by IAASA, the third time the institute was fined in the space of eight months. It called CARB's failure to comply its own procedures on five occasions as " serious" and found that the Chartered Accountants' Institute recklessly "communicated inaccurate and misleading information" to the complainant.

A week after the Irish Government pumped €1 billion into Credit Unions in October 2011, the Central Bank issued a strong warning to auditors they do not sign off on any accounts unless proper provisions are made for bad debts.

Later in the same month the Central Bank again put the work of Auditors under the microscope following their failure to spot systematic and large-scale abuse of client funds at an Investment Firm.

In July 2012, the institute was criticised when it was discovered that it charged Trainee Accountants in the Republic €600 more than those in Northern Ireland for doing exactly the same course.

Following the publication of a report by the Financial Reporting Council in October 2012, the Irish Times in an acid commentary said it speaks " of a profession that lost its way and, rather than provide a check on rule-bending in financial services, became a willing and well-paid accomplice."

In February 2013, Michel Barnier, the EU Commissioner for Internal Market and Services, questioned the conduct of the auditors of Irish banks which lead to the financial crash.

The Central Bank of Ireland in January 2014 demanded better auditing standards from Institute members following the discovery of €235m black hole at Ireland's largest car insurer.

The Chartered Accountants Regulatory Board spotted a pattern of repeat poor performances by some firms in their statutory audits of clients but refused to name those who had received consecutively poor marks for the performance of audits. From June 2016, responsibility for the inspection of public interest entity audits such as those of banks and building societies will be transferred away from the institute.

In November 2025, Ireland's Competition and Consumer Protection Commission (CCPC) announced that, following its intervention, Chartered Accountants Ireland had amended its policy on transferring active training contracts between firms, so that trainees no longer require their current employer's permission before interviewing elsewhere and approval is needed only once a new role is accepted. The CCPC stated that this change removes a significant restriction on competition in the labour market for trainee accountants while retaining requirements such as completion of outstanding training and repayment of fees covered by the original firm.

== Education, careers and advocacy ==
In 2009, Chartered Accountants Ireland introduced a new route to Chartered Accountancy. Originally called 'The Elevation Programme', it is now referred to as the Flexible Route pathway.

The Flexible Route provides students with the option to study and sit exams without undertaking a training contract and gives students a maximum of 8 years to complete all programme requirements. The Training Contract and Flexible Route pathways both have the same entry and qualification requirements and the qualification received on completion is the same.

In 2012, Chartered Accountants Ireland launched a Foreign Direct Investment (FDI) initiative to encourage members to promote Ireland as a location for FDI business.
