= Chief investment officer =

Head of investments in an organization

The chief investment officer (CIO) is a Board-level executive, responsible for investments within an organization. The CIO's purpose is to understand, manage, and monitor their organization's portfolio of assets, devise strategies for growth, act as the liaison with investors, and recognize and avoid serious risks, including those never before encountered, the emphasis being a function of the specific industry. Boards will often create an "Investment Committee" responsible for overall Investment policy, and independent oversight of the specific corporate governance concerns here. Smaller firms may outsource the position to an "OCIO".

== Role ==
The CIO's function and focus will, as mentioned, differ by organization and business-type.

- The chief investment officer at an Asset Management Firm is responsible for overall fund- and risk management. The CIO oversees manager selection and monitoring, and tracks aggregate firm-level risks (exposure across funds, as well as, e.g., reputational risk) ensuring alignment with the firm's risk appetite and regulatory obligations. She will, relatedly, oversee stress testing, and the underlying economic and geopolitical scenario generation. The CIO "signs off", also, re liquidity risk reviews, and (at a quantitative manager) model validation and backtesting.
- At an insurance company (either life or non-life) and/or pension fund, the role is to manage and coordinate investment, liquidity-, interest rate- and asset and liability management in order to optimize investment performance within the firm's risk appetite, typically in conjunction with the actuarial team. Chief investment officers at endowments and foundations similarly consider the liabilities of the organization, with an added focus on liquidity and alternative assets.
- Within corporates more generally, the CIO is responsible for the firm's portfolio of long term assets and corporate investments, with the role, further, overlapping (or being subsumed within) several areas. Thus, the CIO will consult to the corporate finance team, assessing capital investment opportunities and related funding considerations. Similarly, the CIO will work with treasury to decide which products and terms are favorable from a funding perspective, and in the management of (long-term) liquidity and cash-flow. Finally, re the corporate pension fund, the CIO's role is similar to the above, although the end-goal is not profit, but matching the organization's pension assets with its pension liabilities.

== Profile ==
CIOs often have up to ten prior years professional experience within their industry. At investment firms, the CIO often will have been a large "buy side" manager; pension and Insurance CIOs filled the Investment Actuary role; corporate CIOs were Treasury-, Financial- or Corporate Finance Managers. Correspondingly, the CIO will hold the relevant professional credential, and thus, respectively, may be a CAIA / CFA Charterholder, Qualified Actuary, or Professional Accountant. Their educational background is usually a Bachelors (sometimes Masters) in finance, in economics or in accounting. In many cases, the CIO will also earn an MBA, gaining the corporate, strategic and operations perspectives, complementary to the role.

== See also ==
- Chief Financial Officer
- Chief Risk Officer
- CIO also refers:
  - Chief Idea Officer
  - Chief Information Officer
  - Chief Innovation Officer
