= Managerial risk accounting =

Risk in accounting

Managerial Risk Accounting is concerned with the generation, dissemination and use of risk related accounting information to managers within organisations to enable them to judge and shape the risk situation of the organisation according to the objectives of the organisation.

== Subject ==
As a part of the management accounting system and function, managerial risk accounting has the following two main purposes:

- decision-facilitating or decisions-making
- decision-influencing or stewardship

These purposes are achieved by providing respectively relevant information to improve the ability and willingness of the employees to achieve the organisations’s goals and objectives. For the purpose of decision facilitation, decision makers should be provided with an accounting representation of the state-act-outcome set of the decision. Especially, it is necessary to provide statements concerning the likelihood or probability of states and outcomes. For the purpose of stewardship, it is necessary to provide information on the risks taken and their relation to the risk bearing capability of organisation as well as their relationship to the return generated.

== Accounting representation of risk ==
Existing accounting systems are primarily "monovalent". That is, a single accounting value is attributed to a specific object or purpose. In contrast, risk and uncertainty are formally characterised by a whole range of possible values connected to an object.

- Financial accounting: Risks are mainly represented by the recognition of Provision (accounting) or Contingent liability. Fair value measurement partially includes considerations of risk. Hedge accounting allows for limited aggregation of mutually offsetting risks.
- Cost accounting: Risks in the sense of unexpected resource consumption is accounted for by using normalised costs for those events (expected value).
- Capital budgeting: Risk representation ranges from flat adjustments to cash flows and duration via risk adjusted discount rates to decision tree analysis, stochastic simulation and real options.
- Performance measurement: Risk is usually represented in form of risk adjusted discount rates or hurdle rates.

Special risk accounting techniques do exist but are in practice mostly restricted to financial instruments as accounting objects and financial institutions as accounting subjects. They include:

- At-Risk-Measures such as value at risk, Cash Flow at Risk or Earnings at Risk.
- Risk adjusted performance measures as RAROC and RARORAC.

In summary, it can be concluded that the representation of risk and uncertainty in accounting systems is limited in scope and technique as well as dispersed over different systems. As of now, no specialised comprehensive accounting system for the purpose of representing risk organisation wide in comparable terms has evolved. Such a system should allow for the representation of risk in accounting terms connected to the goals of the organisation such as liquidity and profitability on different organisational levels such as the organisation as a whole, business units and projects. Central to this is the configuration of adequate risk measures to capture the risk situation and measures for the capability of the organisation to bear risks (e. g. risk capital). These measures should also take into account behavioural and cognitive aspects of judgement and decision making under risk and uncertainty.

== See also ==
- Corporate finance § Quantifying uncertainty
- Decision making
- Enterprise risk management
- Financial analysis § Firm-level analysis
- Financial risk management and esp. § Corporate finance
- Financial risk modeling
- Financial modeling § Accounting
- FP&A
- Hedge accounting
- Management Accounting
- Risk
- Risk Management
- Risk measure
- Uncertainty
