= Product control =

Banking term

Product Control is a control and support function, responsible for ensuring accurate financial reporting for trading, lending and treasury desks. The function is an important risk management element within investment banking, and is also often employed by corporate treasuries, hedge funds, and more recently, crypto trading firms. Given its responsibilities, Product Control will straddle Finance and Risk Management, reporting into both the CFO and the CRO. See Middle office and Financial risk management § Banking.

As a major deliverable, Product Control produces the daily profit and loss ("P&L") and balance sheet, which internal stakeholders (like the business, financial control, management reporting) all rely upon to assess the performance of the business; the business will need to approve the P&L. (Such approval implies, e.g., that material differences vs a trader flash have been resolved.) These results also make their way outside the organisation and are consumed by regulators - such as the Federal Reserve or the European Central Bank. Once completed, the controller has a thorough picture of the P&L result, and will explain the drivers in a P&L commentary, "P&L Explained", which accompanies the P&L report. Here, re "P&L attribution", the P&L is decomposed into its underlying components, such that P&L from existing positions is attributed to its underlying pricing drivers.

Typically, Product Control is responsible also for Valuation Control. As a key element of the governance structure of financial institutions, this team will independently verify asset prices, thus ensuring that traders mark their books correctly — an important protection against rogue traders — and that the balance sheet is then aligned to the accounting definition of fair value; see Valuation risk. Controllers (here) are usually assigned to a particular asset class, for example Credit, Rates or FX. If the regulator requires it, Valuations govern the Bank's "prudential valuation" submission.

There are additional controls that this function executes. New and amended trades are analysed to ensure these are genuine and measured appropriately, and may then be reported. Funding charges or benefits are reviewed, as are any fees and valuation adjustments. Product Control also assists the business with the onboarding of new products. They do this by ensuring the financial architecture and control framework can accept and process the new products.

There have been high-profile cases in which banks have been fined for this control not working effectively, examples including the USA's financial services regulator, the Securities and Exchange Commission, fining European investment bank Credit Suisse over mismarking bonds during the height of the subprime credit crisis. Poor product control procedure was also noted in the collapse of several US investment banks such as Lehman Brothers.
