= List of spreadsheet mistakes =

This is a list of spreadsheet mistakes summarized as a table, including information about when the incident was reported, the organization(s) it involved, a brief description of the incident, and what was the main spreadsheet mistake issue.

A 2017 study concluded that up to 90% of spreadsheets had errors that affected their results. Moreover, a 2026 survey by San Francisco-based business operations software startup DOSS, shows that 22% operation professionals deal with spreadsheet errors every day at work. Of those respondents, 59% say the most common error was manual data entry mistakes and 46% of respondents say that the second most common error was in spreadsheet formulas.

Date	Organization	Description	Issue	Ref.
January 1995	Fidelity Investments	A $2.6 billion miscalculation after an accountant omitted the minus sign on a net capital loss of $1.3 billion	Omitted minus sign	
June 2003	TransAlta	A $24 million loss from buying more US power transmission hedging contracts at higher prices	Cut and paste issue	
May 2004	University of Toledo	A $2.4 million miscalulation from a typo in a formula overestimated projected revenues	Formula typo	
November 2005	Kodak	An $11 million severance error was due to accidentally adding too many zeros to a single employee's accrued severance	Manual data entry	
October 2008	Barclays	Unintentionally revealing 179 contracts Lehman Brothers had intended to trade	Hidden columns	
July 2011	MI5	A spreadsheet formatting error in 2010 caused MI5 to wrongly collect subscriber data on 134 telephone numbers due to the actual last three digits of telephone numbers being changed to ending in 000	Formatting error	
May 2012	JPMorgan Chase	A $6 billion loss when a Value-at-Risk model was miscalculated	Cut and paste issue	
August 2016	N/A	Research on estimating that one-fifth of papers with supplementary material containing Excel gene lists to have erroneous gene name conversions	Automatic formatting	
September 2016	Lazard	Lazard undervalued SolarCity's valuation by $400 million when performing discounted cash flow valuation analyses	Double-counted	
October 2020	Public Health England	Due to Excel's one million-row spreadsheet limit,15,841 positive Covid tests were left off of the official daily figures	Row limits	
December 2021	Crypto.com	Accidental manual entry caused a $100 refund to be a $10.47 million transfer	Manual data entry	
August 2023	Police Service of Northern Ireland (PSNI)	In response to a Freedom of Information (FoI) request, the PSNI had accidentally shared names and personal details of 10,000 serving police and civilian personnel	Overlooked spreadsheet	
September 2026	Executive Council of British Columbia	Four human-caused adminstrative spreadsheet errors lead to $1.5-billion overestimation of natural gas revenues, with errors including unit and currency conversion errors, a artithemtic error, and misapplication of formulas to cells, ultimately impacting half of the 22 third-party gas price forecasts	Formula dragged to inappropriate cells	

== See also ==
- Model risk § Spreadsheet Errors
- Spreadsheet § Spreadsheet risk
