= Buy-side analyst =

Buy-side analysts ("buy-siders") work for buy side money management firms such as mutual funds, pension funds, trusts, family offices, and hedge funds. They are tasked with identifying investment opportunities that will improve the net worth of the portfolio for which they work by recommending which securities to buy, hold, or sell.

A buy-side analyst typically works in a mutual fund, pension fund, or other non-brokerage firm, and provides research and recommendations exclusively for the benefit of the company's own money managers (as opposed to individual investors). Unlike sell-side recommendations and reports—which are meant for the analyst's brokerage firm's clients, and the broad outlines of which the press often widely disseminates—buy-side recommendations are not available to anyone outside the firm. If the buy-side analyst stumbles upon a formula, vision, or approach that proves effective, it is kept secret. One key difference between buy-side and sell-side analysts lies in their compensation structures. While buy-side analysts are primarily rewarded based on performance, sell-side analysts are typically compensated for their research.

Buy-side analysts employ a number of research methodologies, including fundamental analysis, portfolio analysis, and both quantitative and qualitative analysis. Fundamental analysis involves valuing securities in accordance with a firm's investment strategies, financial performance, industry conditions, and broader economic factors to determine their intrinsic value. Portfolio analysis refers to the assessment of portfolio risks, asset allocation, and the potential impact of market conditions and macroeconomic events on a given firm's overall portfolio.

== See also ==
- Financial analyst § Securities firms
- Sell-side analyst
- Securities research
- Quantitative analysis (finance)
