= Cost analyst =

Finance occupation

In business, a cost analyst is a professional responsible for analyzing a company's costs, or the use of available resources, and reports such analysis to management for decision-making and control. Additional to cost analysis generally, specific work includes whole-life cost analysis and cost–volume–profit analysis.

This role usually sits within the company's financial management area in general; sometimes, specifically, in "FP&A" (Financial planning and analysis).

Cost analysts require a strong background in cost accounting methods, and typically hold a business degree majoring in accountancy, or sometimes, the more focused Bachelor of Accountancy. Due to the specialized nature of the role, cost accountants often also hold a relevant professional certification: Globally recognized, are the CMA through IMA, and the CGMA through CIMA. Other regional bodies include ICMAI in India, and ICMA in Australia. See Financial analyst § Qualification.

== See also ==
- Financial management § Role
- profitability analysis
- budget analyst
