= Deposit risk =

Deposit risk is a type of liquidity risk of a financial institution that is generated by deposits either with defined maturity dates (then such deposits are called 'time' or 'term' deposits) or without defined maturity dates (then such deposits are called 'demand' or 'non-maturity' deposits).

== Types of deposit risk ==
Deposit risk is a risk of probable cash outflows from a financial institution that is caused by changes in depositors' behavior. In its turn, it consists of early withdrawal or redemption risk, rollover risk and run risk.

- Early withdrawal risk of time deposits is a risk that a depositor withdraws his or her deposit from an account before the agreed-upon maturity date. It might occur when the corresponding option was declared in a deposit agreement or determined by local laws. When an early withdrawal is made, the depositor usually incurs an early withdrawal fee or penalty.
- Rollover risk of time deposits is a risk that a depositor refuses to roll over his or her matured time deposit.
- Run risk of non-maturity deposits is a risk that a depositor takes back money from his or her accounts at any time. Thus, a run risk has characters of both early withdrawal and rollover risks. For instance, it occurs when depositors expect a bank to fail.

As a result, these risks might lead to dropping or even losing a liquidity of a financial institution if it cannot to attract new deposits instead of withdrawn ones. Wherein, the impossibility of the financial institution to refinance by borrowing in order to repay existing deposits is called a refinancing risk.

== Exposures to deposit risk ==
- Exposure to early withdrawal risk at a given date is a sum of balances in time deposit accounts excluding those deposits that will be repaid at this date.
- Exposure to rollover risk at a given date is a sum of cash flows from deposits that will be matured at this date.
- Exposure to run risk at a given date is a sum of balances in non-maturity deposit accounts at this date.

An early withdrawal risk affects a rollover risk through decrease of cash flows that will be repaid in the future. The early withdrawal and rollover risks depend on a term to maturity of deposits. The more maturity, the more early withdrawal risk, and the lower rollover risk, and vice versa. The main financial determinants of the early withdrawal and rollover risks are interest rates of the financial institution and its competitors, term to maturity and age of deposit, credit rating of the financial institution, and amount of deposit insurance.

== Evaluation of deposit risk ==
The considered types of deposit risk are usually evaluated by 'cash flow at risk' (also CFaR) approach. Thus, 'Cash Flow at Deposit Risk' is possible cash outflows from a financial institution over a fixed period of time that are predicted with chosen confidence level.
