= Murex (financial software) =

French financial company

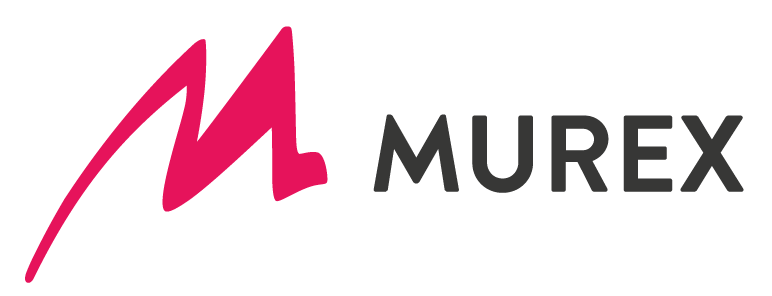
- Type: Société par actions simplifiée = Software industry, Financial services
- Founded: 1986; 40 years ago in Paris, France
- Headquarters: Paris, France
- Number of locations: 20
- Key people: Elias Eddé (CEO), Maroun Eddé (Executive Chairman of the Board of Directors)
- Revenue: EUR 791 million
- Number of employees: 3,400+
- Website: www.murex.com/en

Murex is a financial services company that provides financial software (type of Front End Dealing System) for trading, treasury management, risk management, and post-trade operations. It was founded in 1986 by Laurent Néel and Salim Edde.

Murex has its main office in Paris and serves customers across 70 countries. Murex's platform, MX.3, is used by banks, asset managers, pension funds and insurance companies. Its clients include: UBS, the National Bank of Canada, the Bank of China, OCBC Bank, China Merchants Bank, the National Bank of Kuwait, Banorte and ATB Financial.

== History ==
Murex was founded in 1986 by Laurent Néel and Salim Edde, who were soon followed by Salim's three brothers and his brother-in-law.

In 2013, National Australia Bank undertook an overhaul of its trading operations by going live on MX.3 to support its FX trading and processing. MX.3 was first adopted in Melbourne and subsequently rolled out to its international operations on a phased basis.

In 2014, the Singaporean-based bank, DBS, adopted MX.3 in its risk management operations. That same year, Murex partnered with Tullet Prebon, allowing them to use TPI data for internal model validation. Then, in November, UBS announced that it had chosen Murex's software to replace a large part of its fixed income platform technology, including the booking of trades, valuation and risk management.

In the Truffle 100 rankings for 2016, Murex became the third largest French software publisher with an announced turnover of 460 million euros.

In 2017, China Merchants Bank (CMB) went live on Murex's MX.3 trading platform to improve the technology at its Shenzhen and Shanghai operations, following the bank becoming one of the first Chinese financial institutions to join the R3 blockchain consortium. Murex took part in the pilot project for Teen Turn in Dublin, an initiative that seeks to create a talent pipeline for women in science, technology, engineering, and mathematics (STEM). Murex announced its partnership with Microsoft, bringing MX.3 into the cloud with certification on Microsoft Azure.

ATB Financial began the first phase of moving its infrastructure and application management into the cloud with the implementation of Murex's MX.3 Software-as-a-Service (SaaS) in August 2017. In 2020, the final phase of the project was completed as ATB's commodities desk went live.

In December 2017, Murex collaborated with Amazon Web Services to make MX.3 available on Amazon's cloud platform. MX.3 on the cloud can be used for applications such as development and testing, running production processes, disaster recovery and accessing cloud-based managed services.

In 2018, Nationwide Building Society went live on MX.3 to replace its legacy system and secure wider funding sources, review pricing rules and implement tighter risk, liquidity and collateral controls. Murex partnered on the project with Sapient Global Markets, which delivered testing automation for fast-track deployments.

Italy-based Banca IMI, a subsidiary of Intesa Sanpaolo, migrated its equity derivatives business to MX.3 as part of a technology update for its capital markets business.

Bankdata, a Danish banking IT provider, announced it was expanding its use of MX.3 to its remaining member banks following implementation with Jyske Bank and Sydbank. MX.3 replaces legacy systems, providing one platform covering the whole trade lifecycle and centralizing risk calculation, trading and settlement data for real-time processing.

The Depository Trust & Clearing Corporation (DTCC) partnered with Murex to support reporting requirements under the Securities Financing Transactions Regulation (SFTR). Murex's SFTR solution will link to DTCC's Global Trade Repository to enable simplified reporting and lower implementation costs.

In 2019, Banorte, Mexico's second-largest investment bank, announced it was extending its use of MX.3 for some of its main risk and compliance functions. MX.3 will enable Banorte to automate and digitize its operations, including counterparty risk, derivatives valuation adjustment (XVA) and collateral management.

Ping An Bank, a Chinese joint-stock commercial bank, adopted Murex's MX.3 platform in 2019. The bank's aim was to close the gap between the front and back office, enabling its expansion into new areas.

In 2020, Thai bank Krungsri (Bank of Ayudhya) implemented Murex's IT platform MX.3 to simplify its existing IT infrastructure and improve regulatory reporting transparency. Murex facilitated the first overnight indexed swap derivatives transaction based on the new Thai reference rate, THOR, for Kasikornbank. In the Truffle 100 rankings for 2020, Murex was recognized as the third largest French software publisher with an announced turnover of 569 million euros.

Ahead of the Libor transition, a global effort to reform interest rate benchmarks, Murex is working with its clients to prepare their IT systems.

In 2021, Murex adds physical presence in Cyprus to bolster its regional footprint in the Europe-Middle East-Africa region.

In April 2022, Murex announced a partnership deal with Polish-based financial institution Pekao. The deal included Murex to aid in the technological transformation of Pekao and to implement its MX.3 platform.

== Corporate affairs and culture ==
In 2017 Murex sponsored Teen Turn's pilot project, hosting a two-week work placement at their offices in Dublin where female employees acted as mentors for local students. In 2018, Murex again sponsored Teen Turn, supporting an event for mentors and women in technology in Dublin.
