= Benchmark-driven investment strategy =

Benchmark-driven investment strategy is an investment strategy where the target return is usually linked to an index or combination of indices of the sector or any other such as the S&P 500.

With the Benchmarks approach the investor chooses an index of the market (benchmark). The goal of the fund manager is to try to beat the index performance-wise.

- The strategic asset allocation is usually delegated to the benchmark chosen
- The asset managers stay concentrated to tactical asset allocation and fund (security) selection
- No volatility control over time
- Without volatility constraints over a long period the investor is expected to get higher returns

== See also ==
- Liability-driven investment strategy
- Financial risk management § Investment management
