= Sell-side analyst =

A sell-side analyst works for an investment bank or a brokerage firm and evaluates companies for future earnings growth and other investment criteria. Aside from stimulating buying and selling, the reliability of the research will help the client make a better decision. They sometimes place recommendations on company shares publicly listed or other securities, typically phrased as "buy", "sell", or "hold." They offer their recommendations to clients. Buying and selling of securities will produce commissions for the brokerage. When a brokerage is also a market maker for the stock being rated, the analyst might influence the price of shares and the brokerage ultimately reap the benefits.

Conflict of interest charges were filed against some sell-side analysts in 2002 after the dot-com bubble had collapsed. These inquiries led to SEC enforcement actions against Jack Grubman and Henry Blodget.

The performance of sell-side analysts was compared with the results of buy-side analysts. In this study, the outcome was positive for sell-side analysts.

A proper title for some sell-side analysts is Equity or Credit Research Analyst.

== See also ==
- Buy-side analyst
- Financial analyst § Securities firms
- Securities research
- Trade idea
