= Collateral management =

Prevention of payment default by trading partners

Collateral has been used for hundreds of years to provide security against the possibility of payment default by the opposing party in a trade. Collateral management began in the 1980s, with Bankers Trust and Salomon Brothers taking collateral against credit exposure. There were no legal standards, and most calculations were performed manually on spreadsheets. Collateralisation of derivatives exposures became widespread in the early 1990s. Standardisation began in 1994 via the first ISDA documentation.

In the modern banking industry collateral is mostly used in over the counter (OTC) trades. However, collateral management has evolved rapidly in the last 15–20 years with increasing use of new technologies, competitive pressures in the institutional finance industry, and heightened counterparty risk from the wide use of derivatives, securitization of asset pools, and leverage. As a result, collateral management is now a very complex process with interrelated functions involving multiple parties. Since 2014, large pensions and sovereign wealth funds, which typically hold high levels of high-quality securities, have been looking into opportunities such as collateral transformation to earn fees.

== The basics of collateral ==
=== What is collateral and why is it used? ===
Borrowing funds often requires the designation of collateral on the part of the recipient of the loan.

Collateral is legally watertight, valuable liquid property that is pledged by the recipient as security on the value of the loan.

The main reason of taking collateral is credit risk reduction, especially during the time of the debt defaults, the currency crisis and the failure of major hedge funds. But there are many other motivations why parties take collateral from each other:

- Reduction of exposure in order to do more business with each other when credit limits are under pressure
- Possibility to achieve regulatory capital savings by transferring or pledging eligible assets
- Offer of keener pricing of credit risk
- Improved access to market liquidity by collateralisation of interbank derivatives exposures
- Access to more exotic businesses
- Possibility of doing risky exotic trades

These motivations are interlinked, but the overwhelming driver for use of collateral is the desire to protect against credit risk. Many banks do not trade with counterparties without collateral agreements. This is typically the case with hedge funds.

=== Types of collateral ===
There is a wide range of possible collaterals used to collateralise credit exposure with various degrees of risks. The following types of collaterals are used by parties involved:

- Cash
- Government securities (often direct obligations of G10 countries: Belgium, Canada, France, Germany, Italy, Japan, Netherlands, Sweden, Switzerland, United Kingdom and the United States)
- Mortgage-backed securities (MBSs)
- Corporate bonds/commercial papers
- Letters of credit/guarantees
- Equities
- Government agency securities
- Covered bonds
- Real estate
- Metals and commodities

The most predominant form of collateral is cash and government securities. According to ISDA, cash represents around 82% of collateral received and 83% of collateral delivered in 2009, which is broadly consistent with last year’s results. Government securities constitute fewer than 10% of collateral received and 14% of collateral delivered this year, again consistent with end-2008. The other types of collateral are used less frequently.

== What Is Collateral Management? ==
=== The idea of collateral management ===
The practice of putting up collateral in exchange for a loan has long been a part of the lending process between businesses. With more institutions seeking credit, as well as the introduction of newer forms of technology, the scope of collateral management has grown. Increased risks in the field of finance have inspired greater responsibility on the part of borrowers, and it is the aim of the collateral management to make sure the risks are as low as possible for the parties involved.

Collateral management is the method of granting, verifying, and giving advice on collateral transactions in order to reduce credit risk in unsecured financial transactions. The fundamental idea of collateral management is very simple, that is cash or securities are passed from one counterparty to another as security for a credit exposure. In a swap transaction between parties A and B, party A makes a mark-to-market (MtM) profit whilst party B makes a corresponding MtM loss. Party B then presents some form of collateral to party A to mitigate the credit exposure that arises due to positive MtM. The form of collateral is agreed before initiation of the contract. Collateral agreements are often bilateral. Collateral has to be returned or posted in the opposite direction when exposure decreases. In the case of a positive MtM, an institution calls for collateral and in the case of a negative MtM they have to post collateral.

Collateral management has many different functions. One of these functions is credit enhancement, in which a borrower is able to receive more affordable borrowing rates. Aspects of portfolio risk, risk management, capital adequacy, regulatory compliance and operational risk and asset liability management are also included in many collateral management situations. A balance sheet technique is another commonly utilized facet of collateral management, which is used to maximize bank's resources, ensure asset liability coverage rules are honoured, and seek out further capital from lending excess assets. Several sub-categories such as collateral arbitrage, collateral outsourcing, tri-party repurchase agreements, and credit risk assessment are just a few of the functions addressed in collateral management.

=== Parties involved ===
Collateral management involves multiple parties:

- Collateral Management Team: Calculate collateral valuations, deliver and to receive collateral, maintain relevant data, handle margin calls, and to liaise with other parties in the collateral chain.
- Credit Analysis Team: sets and approves collateral requirements for new and existing counterparties.
- Front Office: establishes trading relationships and on-boards new accounts.
- Middle Office
- Legal Department
- Valuation Department
- Accounting & Finance
- Third Party Service Providers

=== Establishment of collateral relationship ===
Once a new customer is identified by the Sales department, a basic credit analysis of that customer is conducted by the Credit Analysis team. Only credit-worthy customers will be allowed to trade on a non-collateralised basis. In the next step parties negotiate and come to the appropriate agreement. In the world's major trading centres, counterparties predominantly use ISDA Credit Support Annex (CSA) standards to ensure clear and effective contracts exist before transactions begin. Important points in the collateral agreement to be covered are:

- Base currency
- Type of agreement
- Quantification of parameters such as independent amount, minimum transfer amount and rounding
- Appropriate collateral that may be posted by each counterparty
- Quantification of haircuts that act to discount the value of various forms of collateral with price volatility
- Timings regarding the delivery of collateral (margin call frequency, notification time, delivery periods)
- Interest rates payable for cash collateral

Then the collateral teams on both sides establish the collateral relationship. Key details are communicated and entered into the two collateral systems. Some initial collateral may be posted to enable the counterparties to trade immediately in small size. Once the account is fully established the counterparties can trade freely.

=== Collateral management operations process ===
The responsibility of the Collateral Management department is a large and complex task. Daily actions include:

- Managing Collateral Movements: to record details of the collateralised relationship in the collateral management system, to monitor customer exposure and collateral received or posted on the agreed mark-to-market, to call for margin as required, to transfer collateral to its counterparty once a valid call has been made, to check collateral to be received for the eligibility, to reuse collateral in accordance with policy guidelines, to deal with disagreements and disputes over exposure calculations and collateral valuations, to reconcile portfolio of transactions.
- Custody, Clearing and Settlement
- Valuations: to evaluate all securities and cash positions held and posted as collateral. Valuations may be done on an end-of-day or intraday basis.
- Margin Calls: to notify, track, and resolve margin calls.
- Substitutions: to deal with requests for collateral substitutions both ways. For example, one party would like to substitute one form of collateral for another.
- Processing: to pay over coupons on securities promptly after receipt to collateral providers, to pay over interest on cash collateral and to monitor its receipt

=== Advantages and disadvantages ===
The advantages and disadvantages of collateral include:

Advantages of collateral:

- Reduced credit risk
- Economic capital savings: netting counterparty exposures reduces economic capital required to trade. See credit risk, balance sheet protection, Basel II, Solvency II).
- Diversification
- Improved liquidity
- Higher profits
- Higher trading efficiency

Disadvantages of collateral:

- Increases operational risk
- Legal risk
- Concentration risk
- Settlement risk
- Valuation risk
- Increasing market risk
- Increased overhead
- Reduced trading activity

== See also ==
- Margin (finance)
- Repurchase agreement
- OTC derivatives
