= Accounting analyst =

Occupation
- Names: Accounting analyst
- Occupation type: profession
- Activity sectors: Financial services

Description
- Competencies: management skills, sense of analysis
- Education required: see professional requirements
- Fields of employment: Private corporations financial services industry government
- Related jobs: Financial analyst Accountant

An accounting analyst evaluates public company financial statements. Public companies issue these (10-K) annual financial statements as required by the Security and Exchange Commission. The statements include the balance sheet, the income statement, the statement of cash flows and the notes to the financial statements.

== Description ==
Accounting analysts have extensive training in understanding financial accounting principles for public companies based on generally accepted accounting principles as provided by the Financial Accounting Standards Board. Or, they may have additional experience in applying international accounting standards based on the rules put out by the International Accounting Standards Board.

As an example, the accounting analyst may work for a financial research company evaluating differing financial accounting principles and how they influence the company's reported wealth.

== Professional requirements ==
The accounting analyst will most likely hold an accounting qualification. The analyst may have an MBA degree with an Accounting specialization.

In addition, the analyst may hold the Chartered Certified Accountant (ACCA) or Certified Public Accountant (CPA) or Chartered Accountant (CA or ACA) designation.

== See also ==
- Accountant
- Financial accounting
