= Investment policy statement =

An Investment policy statement (IPS) is a document, generally between an investor and the assisting investment manager, recording the agreements the two parties come to related to issues relating to how the investor's money is to be managed. In other cases, an IPS may also be created by an investment committee (e.g., those charged with making investment decisions for an endowment or pension plan) to help establish and record its own policies in order to assist in future decision-making or to help maintain consistency of its policies by future committee members or to clarify expectations for prospective money managers who may be hired by the committee.

== Regulations ==
There are two levels of legal and regulatory oversight: the legal requirements for clients who are fiduciaries or trustees for an account, and the regulations applicable to an advisor's practice. It is important to understand the requirements for each.

=== ERISA ===
An investment policy is required under virtually all investor circumstances, with the exception of individual investors. According to the US Employee Retirement Income Security Act of 1974, as amended (ERISA), for every qualified company retirement plan (e.g., 401[k], profit sharing, pension, 403[b]) there are certain fiduciary responsibilities for managing the plan assets with the care, skill, prudence and diligence of a prudent expert and by diversifying the investments of the plan so as to minimize the risk of large losses. The IPS documents these fiduciary responsibilities and ensures fiduciaries are adhering to these responsibilities.

When auditing an ERISA plan, the U.S. Department of Labor regularly asks to review the associated IPS. This is due to ERISA regulations requiring that employee benefit plans are managed to ensure that investment firms meet their financial responsibility to the employees covered by such plans. Under ERISA, all qualified plan trustees have a special responsibility to "prudently" manage their plan assets for the sole benefit of the plan participants.

=== UPIA and other legislation ===
The US Uniform Prudent Investor Act (UPIA) is state-adopted legislation that governs the investment conduct of private family trusts. First enacted in 1994, it serves as the hallmark of subsequent legislation (as well as how the courts now interpret such requirements relating to ERISA). UPIA requires a written investment policy for every trust in which trustees manage assets for the benefit of others. UPIA formally requires a focus on the total portfolio, rather than following its earlier regulatory guidance that individual investments should be evaluated independently of whether or not they were appropriate for portfolio inclusion. The total portfolio is now the fiduciary's central consideration when judging the trade off between risk and return. There are no more restrictions on the types of investments that can be included in the portfolio; the trustee can invest in anything that helps achieve the risk/return objectives of the trust and that meets the other requirements of prudent investing.

== IPS and the investment process ==
The investment process can be seen as occurring in six steps, as described below. Many experts believe that the creation of the IPS is the single most important step in this process. All the other steps either lead into the IPS, or are directed by the IPS.

1. Initial discovery: The initial discussions and sharing of documents that allows both the client and the advisor to learn about one another. On the one hand, this might include learning about the client's circumstances, goals, income needs, restrictions, current holdings, risk tolerance, etc. The client should also attempt to learn as much as possible about the investment manager's investment philosophy, practices, and procedures.
2. Discussion and agreement: All the issues related to what is to happen between client and advisor should be placed on the table. Where there are questions or a lack of clarity exists, further discussion may be needed. Eventually, the client and advisors need to come to agreement on issues such as the degree of client involvement, the asset allocation to be used, the kinds of instruments to be utilized (or not), how tax considerations will be treated, investment goals, needs for liquidity or income, investment restrictions, investment methodology, and responsibilities of each party to the other.
3. Creating the IPS: Once the agreements have been reached on the full list of issues and policies to be followed, they need to be recorded. This document will become the IPS. The client(s) and the advisor sign the document, signifying each party's acknowledgment of the agreements.
4. Investment implementation: Until there is an agreement between the advisor and client about the policies to be followed, no investment trades can responsibly happen. Once the IPS has been signed by all parties, the initial and ongoing trades can be implemented according to the road map provided by the IPS.
5. Ongoing communication: Meetings, reports, and other communications will occur between advisor and client, generally as suggested in the IPS.
6. Monitoring and adjustment: Rarely does a portfolio stay as originally structured. The IPS should describe how the portfolio will be monitored for poor performers, how good performers will be identified, how (and if) rebalancing and tax loss harvesting opportunities will be implemented, and it should address any other ways in which the investment manager will try to ensure that the portfolio will stay in line with the objectives set forth in the IPS.

Clients and their needs change over time. It is therefore important that the advisor periodically returns to the first step "discovery" to make sure the client's then-current needs and wishes are being addressed. Every year or two, the IPS should be reviewed by the client and the advisor to ensure continued agreement with its provisions.

=== Required components ===
Nothing should be included in the IPS to which the advisor or client cannot commit and be sure will be implemented.

An IPS usually has five major components that should be unique to each client.

1. All key factual data about the client, including where the client's assets are held, the amount of their assets under the management of portfolio manager, and the identification of the trustees or interested parties to the account. This can be as detailed or as simple as desired.

2. A discussion and review of the client's investment objectives, investment time horizon, anticipated withdrawals or deposits, need for reserves or liquidity, and attitudes regarding tolerance for risk and volatility.

3. Any constraints and restrictions on the assets, such as liquidity and marketability requirements, diversification concentrations, the advisor's investment strategy (including tax management), locations of assets by account type (taxable versus tax-deferred), how client accounts that are not being managed (if any) will be handled, and any transaction prohibitions.

4. The security types and asset classes to be included in or excluded from the portfolio, and the basic allocation among asset categories and the variance (rebalancing) limits for this allocation.

5. The monitoring and control procedures and responsibilities of each party.

== Sources ==
- Prudent Investment Practices: A Handbook for Investment Fiduciaries, published by the Foundation for Fiduciary Studies
- "Investment Policy: how to win the Losers Game," Charles Ellis, Irwin Publishing
- "The Management of Investment Decisions," Trone, Albright & Taylor, McGraw-Hill
