= Concentration risk =

Concentration risk is a banking term describing the level of risk in a bank's portfolio arising from concentration to a single counterparty, sector or country.

The risk arises from the observation that more concentrated portfolios are less diverse and therefore the returns on the underlying assets are more correlated.

Concentration risk is usually monitored by risk functions, committees and boards within commercial banks and is normally only allowed to operate within proscribed limits. It is also monitored by banking regulators and generally attracts a higher capital charge in banking regulation.

== Types ==
There are two types of concentration risk. These types are based on the sources of the risk. Concentration risk can arise from uneven distribution of exposures (or loan) to its borrowers. Such a risk is called name concentration risk. Another type is sectoral concentration risk, which can arise from uneven distribution of exposures to particular sectors, regions, industries or products.

== Calculation ==
Concentration risk can be calculated for a single bank loan or whole portfolio using a "concentration ratio".

- For a single loan, the concentration ratio is simply the proportion of the portfolio the loan represents (e.g. a $100 loan in a $1000 portfolio would have a ratio of 0.1 or 10%)
- For a whole portfolio, a herfindahl index is used to calculate the degree of concentration to a single name, sector of the economy or country. Separate concentration ratios must be calculated for each type of concentration.

To illustrate, a portfolio with 10 equally sized loans would have a concentration ratio of 0.1 or 10%, whereas a portfolio of 10 loans - 9 equally sized and 1 equal to half the value of the portfolio would have a concentration ratio of 0.27 or 27%.

The ratio is useful for bankers or investors at large to identify when a portfolio may be excessively exposed to the risk that a recession or downturn in one sector of the economy or another country may cause a high proportion of the bank's outstanding loans to default.

== Monitoring and management ==
Most financial institutions have policies to identify and limit concentration risk. This typically involves setting certain thresholds for various types of risk. Once these thresholds are set, they are managed by frequent and diligent reporting to assess concentration areas and identify elevated thresholds. A key component to the management of concentration risk is accurately defining thresholds across various concentrations to minimize the combined risks across concentrations. See Financial risk management § Banking.

== Concentration risk in other disciplines ==
As a concept, concentration risk is used in other financial and non-financial sectors. For example, several types of concentration risk are used in investment management, in the economic analysis of monopolies (via the Herfindahl-Hirschman Index), or in epidemiology where the Lorenz curve from economics is used to analyze the concentration of risk in a population.
