= Profitability analysis =

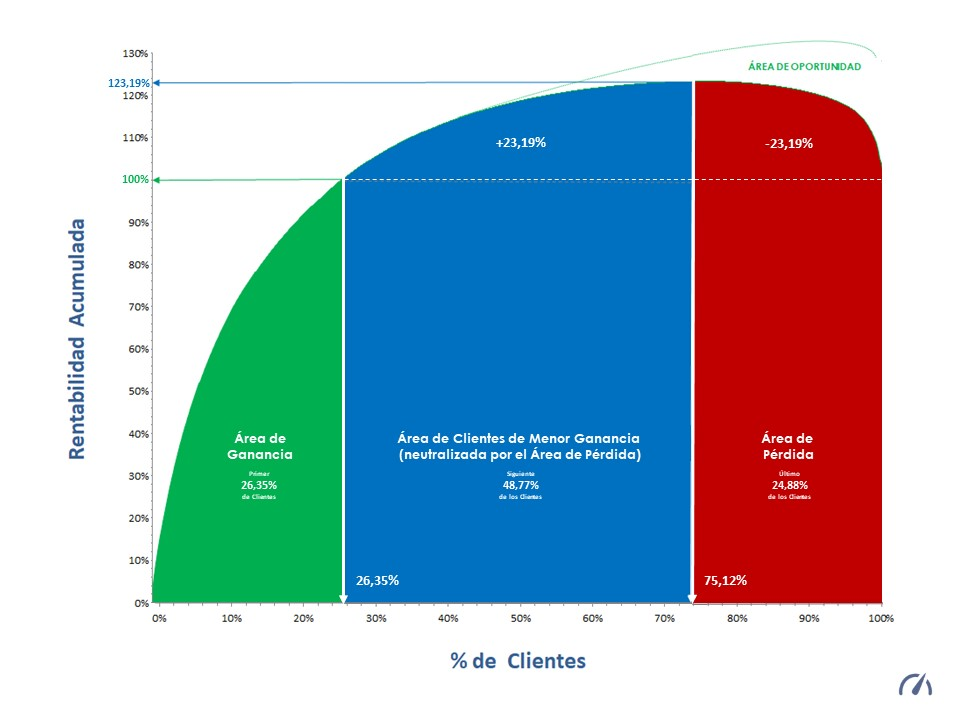
Whale Curve Analysis (by Adrián Chiogna)

In cost accounting, profitability analysis is an analysis of the profitability of an organisation's output. Output of an organisation can be grouped into products, customers, locations, channels and/or transactions.

== Description ==
In order to perform a profitability analysis, all costs of an organisation have to be allocated to output units by using intermediate allocation steps and drivers. This process is called costing. When the costs have been allocated, they can be deducted from the revenues per output unit. The remainder shows the unit margin of a product, client, location, channel or transaction.

After calculating the profit per unit, managers or decision makers can use the outcome to substantiate management decisions. Managers can decide to stop selling loss making products, to reduce costs for loss making customers or to increase sales in profitable locations.

== Pareto analysis ==
In profitability analysis it is possible to perform a Pareto analysis by ranking output units from most profitable to least profitable. By doing so it is possible to create a so-called 'Whale Curve', graphically showing the potential margin of an organisation.
