= Risk factor (finance) =

Concept in finance

In finance, risk factors are the building blocks of investing that help explain systematic returns in the equity market and the possibility of losing money in investments or business adventures. A risk factor is a concept in finance theory such as the capital asset pricing model, arbitrage pricing theory and other theories that use pricing kernels. In these models, the rate of return of an asset (hence the converse its price) is a random variable whose realization in any time period is a linear combination of other random variables plus a disturbance term or white noise. In practice, a linear combination of observed factors included in a linear asset pricing model (for example, the Fama–French three-factor model) proxy for a linear combination of unobserved risk factors if financial market efficiency is assumed. In the Intertemporal CAPM, non-market factors proxy for changes in the investment opportunity set.

Risk factors occur whenever any sort of asset is involved, and there are many forms of risks from credit, liquidity risks to investment and currency risks.

Different participants of risk factors contain different risk factors for each participant, for example, financial risks for the individual, financial risks for the Market, financial risks for the Government etc.

== Financial risks for the individual ==
Financial risks for individuals occur when they make sub-optimal decisions. There are several types of Individual risk factors; pure risk, liquidity risk, speculative risk, and currency risk. Pure Risk is a type of risk where the outcome cannot be controlled, and only has two outcomes which are complete loss or no loss at all. An example of pure risk for an individual would be owning an equipment, there is risk of it being stolen and there would be a loss to the individual, however, if it weren't stolen, there is no gain but only no loss for the individual. Liquidity Risk is when securities cannot be purchased or sold fast enough to cut losses in a volatile market. An example to which an individual might experience liquidity risk would be no one willing to purchase a security you own, and the value of your security significantly drops. Speculative risks are made based on conscious choices, and results in an uncertain degree of gain or loss. An example of speculative risk is purchasing stocks, the future of the stock's price is uncertain, and both a gain or loss could occur depending on whether if the stock price rises or decreases. Currency risk is when exchange rates changes will affect the profitability of when one is committed to it and the time when it is carried out. An example of currency risk would be if interest rates were higher in U.S compared to Australia, the Australian dollar would drop in comparison to the U.S. This is due to the increase in demand for USD as investors take advantage of higher yields, thus exchange rate fluctuates and the individual is exposed to risks in the foreign exchange markets.

== Financial risks for the market ==
Financial Risks for the market are associated with price fluctuation and volatility. Risk factors consist of interest rates, foreign currency exchange rates, commodity and stock prices, and through their non-stop fluctuations, it produces a change in the price of the financial instrument. Market Risk (systematic risk) is the risk an investor experiences when the value of an investment decreases due to financial market factors. The failure of a single company or cluster of companies could lead to the entire market crashing and the way to reduce this risk is through diversification into assets that are not co-related to the market. An example is during the 2008 financial crisis, when a core sector of the market suffered, the volatile risk created effected the monetary well-being of the entire marketplace. During this time, businesses closed, there was an estimated loss of $6 trillion to $14 trillion, and governments were forced to rethink their economic policies. A similar situation is observed during the COVID-19 global pandemic crisis, where a massive economic fall-out had occurred due to the lack of economic activity. The global economy came to a halt, aggregate demand rapidly decreased, and even oil prices plummeted to almost negative $40, which meant producers paid buyers to take oil off their hands as storing oil was costly.

== Financial risks for businesses ==
Financial Risk for businesses rises due to the need for funding in order to expand and grow the business, or when they sell products on credit. There are several types of financial risks in businesses, including credit risks, specific risks, and operational risks. Credit risk are the dangers of default occurring when a creditor lends money to a borrower. Examples of credit risks include businesses not being able to retrieve their money when they sell products on credit and may experience a rise in costs to collect the debt. Businesses can also experience credit risk as the borrowers, as they must manage cash flows in order to pay back their accounts payable (Chen, 2019) (Maverick, 2020) (LaBarre, 2020). Specific risks a.k.a. unsystematic risks are hazards that are unique and apply only to a certain asset or company. An example of an unsystematic risk is if a company has poor reputation or there are strikes among company employees, only that specific company is affected. Unsystematic risk can be avoided through diversification where, where investors invest in a wide variety of stocks. Companies face operational risks whenever it attempts to do ordinary business activities and can also be classified as a variety of specific risk. Operational risks stem from man-made choices, thus are the risks of business operations failing due to human error. Examples of Operational risks would be keeping a subpar sales staff team as it has lower wage costs, but it comes with higher operational risks as the staff are more likely to make mistakes.

== Financial risks in investing ==
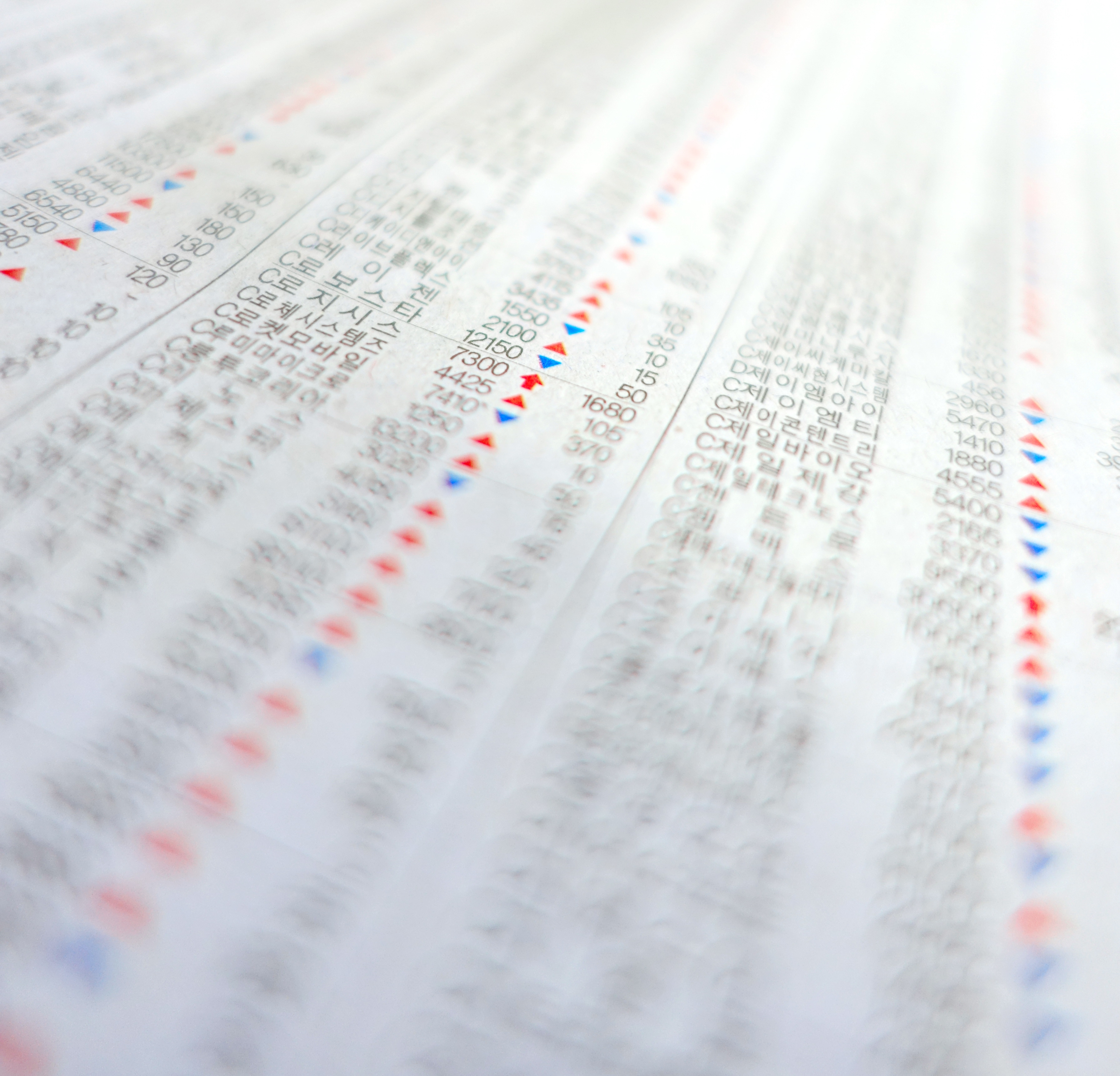
Stock price fluctuation

Investing is allocating money, effort, or time into something in hopes of generating income or profit. A common investment is investing in stocks, purchasing them at a low price then reselling it later at a higher price to earn the difference as profit. Stock investing comes with very high risks as every single piece of information would cause market prices to fluctuate.

=== Economic risk ===
One of the most obvious risk is economic risk, where the economy could go bad at any given moment, causing stock prices to plummet.

=== Commodity price risk ===
Commodity price risk is the possibility of a commodity price fluctuating, potentially causing financial losses for the buyers or producers of a commodity. As Commodity prices are basic raw materials, it creates a domino effect, affecting all products that require the commodity. For example, oil consumers often face commodity price risk, as oil is a widely used necessity product currently, many producers’ profits are affected by the fluctuation of oil price.

=== Inflationary risk and interest rate risk ===
Other risks like inflationary risk and interest rate risks usually go hand in hand, as interest rates are increased in order to combat inflation, which in turn causes businesses operation cost to increase, making it harder to stay in business, which then leads to a reduction in their stock prices. Inflation on its own also destroys value of stocks and creates recessions in the market.

=== Headline risk ===
A very transparent risk is headline risk, where any stories in the media that will damage a company's reputation would hurt their business and reduce their stock prices. An example is the Fukushima nuclear crisis in 2011, which punished their stocks and caused excessive backlash against any businesses related to the story.

=== Obsolescence risk ===
A risk that arises due to technological advancement is obsolescence risk, where a process, product or technology used by a company to generate profit becomes obsolete as competitors find cheaper alternatives. An example of this are publishing companies, as computers, phones, and devices becomes more advanced, more and more people read news, magazines and books online instead of the printed form as it's cheaper and more convenient, which caused publishing companies to slowly become obsolete.

=== Model risk ===
When people rely too much on the assumptions underlying economic and business models is model risk. When the models are inaccurate, all stakeholders that relied on the financial model are exposed to risks as the quantitative information utilized are made based on insufficient information. An example of this is the Long Term Capital Management (LTCM) debacle, which caused them great financial loss because of a small error in their computer models, which was magnified by their highly leveraged trading strategy.

== Financial risks for the government ==
Government involved risk rises in a two-way factor; first is the Government's policies which create interest rate and aggregate demand fluctuations, and the second is investing directly in Government bonds.

=== Government policies ===
Government enforces policies and regulations, to which businesses must oblige to be able to fairly compete against each other. From time to time, the government changes these frameworks which creates risks for businesses as they are forced to adapt and change how they operate. The government changes their policies depending on the current economic situation, in order to stimulate economic growth and maintain a healthy level of inflation. The change in interest rates would cause aggregate demand to increase or decrease, forcing the market to adjust to the new equilibrium in the long run. For example, if the government were to increase interest rates, business sales would decrease, due to people more willing to save, and vice versa. Another fiscal policy example would be if the government were to increase their spending, it would increase aggregate demand, and cause business sales to increase. The reserve banks have a role in mitigating the financial risks that would create financial disturbances and systematic consequences.

=== Government bonds ===
When an individual or group purchases a government bond, they lend money to the government, and in return they get paid a promised interest rate. Investing in government bonds is generally safer than stocks but still contains risks, e.g. interest rate risks where market rates rise and we could be earning more in investing in other investments, inflation risks where a higher inflation reduces the amount earned from interest, liquidity risks where no one wants to buy the bonds when we want to sell it, and chances that the government loses control of their monetary policy and default on their bonds.

== Tools to control financial risk ==
The most common tools/methods used to control financial risk are risk analysis, fundamental analysis, technical analysis, and quantitative analysis.

Fundamental analysis is a method that looks at a business's fundamental financial level, revenue, expenses, growth prospects and then measures the securities intrinsic value. By measuring the securities intrinsic value, they are able to predict the stock price movements and reduce potential risk factors.

Technical analysis is a method that utilizes past prices, statistics, historical returns, share prices, etc., to evaluate securities. Through technical analysis, investors are able to determine the volatility and momentum of the securities, thus reducing financial risks when they decide on who the invest.

Quantitative analysis is the process of gathering data in numerous fields and evaluating their historical performance through financial ratio calculations. For example certain ratios like debt-to-capital ratio, or capital expenditure ratio are utilized to measure a company's performance and then using the data to determine the risk factors of investing in this company.
