= Earnings at risk =

Estimate of the potential impact of market movements on a firm's earnings

Earnings at risk (EaR) and the related cash flow at risk (CFaR) are measures reflecting the potential impact of market risk on the income statement and cash flow statement respectively, and hence the risk to the institution's return on assets and, ultimately, return on equity. EaR measures the impact on net interest income due to movements in foreign exchange and interest rates; while CFaR measures possible shortfalls in cash flow due to these. Both are calculated under simulation as for Value at Risk.

== Methodology ==
Earnings at Risk (EaR) and Cash Flow at Risk (CFaR) are forward-looking risk measures derived using scenario analysis or simulation techniques similar to those employed in Value at Risk (VaR) models. Financial institutions typically model changes in interest rates, foreign exchange rates, or other market variables and estimate their impact on projected net interest income or forecasted cash flows over a specified time horizon.

Under simulation-based approaches, such as Monte Carlo analysis, thousands of possible market scenarios are generated to produce a distribution of potential earnings or cash flow outcomes. EaR or CFaR is then reported as a percentile loss (for example, the 5th percentile), indicating the maximum expected shortfall under adverse but plausible market conditions.
