= Chartered Alternative Investment Analyst =

Professional designation in U.S. securities

Chartered Alternative Investment Analyst (CAIA)
- Established: 2002
- Type: Professional Designation
- Purpose: Finance
- Location: Amherst, Massachusetts
- Region served: Worldwide
- Members: 14,000 (2025)
- CEO: John L. Bowman, CFA
- Website: www.caia.org

Chartered Alternative Investment Analyst (CAIA) (pronounced "KAI-ah") is a professional designation offered by the CAIA Association to investment professionals who complete a course of study and pass two examinations. The "alternative investments" industry is characterized as dealing with asset classes and investments other than standard equity or fixed income products. Alternative investments can include hedge funds, private equity, real assets, valuable economic goods, structured products, and digital assets.

The Chartered Alternative Investment Analyst Association was founded in 2002 by the Alternative Investment Management Association (AIMA) and the Center for International Securities and Derivatives Markets (CISDM). As of May 2025, there are 14,000 CAIA members. CAIA designees are required to maintain membership in the CAIA Association and adhere to professional and ethical standards.

== Curriculum ==
The CAIA curriculum is designed to provide finance professionals with a broad base of knowledge in alternative investments and consists of two exam levels that are revised regularly to incorporate relevant, practical industry developments, and the latest academic research. The Level I curriculum focuses on the fundamentals of alternative investment markets, while Level II concentrates on advanced topics in alternative investments. Both levels take a global perspective and incorporate issues of ethics and professional conduct.

The CAIA Level I exam consists of 200 multiple-choice questions. The Level I curriculum covers seven topics, listed below. CAIA Level I candidates are assumed to have an elementary undergraduate understanding of the basic concepts of traditional finance and quantitative analysis.

The Level I curriculum covers:

- CAIA Ethical Principles
  - Ethics
  - Professionalism and Fiduciary Responsibilities
- Introduction to Alternative Investments
  - Alpha and Beta Estimations
  - Alpha, Beta, and Hypothesis Testing
  - Derivatives and Risk-Neutral Valuation
  - Financial Economics Foundations
  - Measures of Risk and Performance
  - Quantitative Foundations
  - Statistical Foundations
  - The Environment of Alternative Investments
  - What is An Alternative Investment?
- Real Assets
  - Commodities
  - Natural Resources and Land
  - Other Real Assets
  - Overview of Real Estate
  - Real Estate Assets
  - Real Estate Methods
- Hedge Funds
  - Equity Hedge Funds
  - Event-Driven Hedge Funds
  - Macro and Managed Futures Funds
  - Relative Value Hedge Funds
  - The Hedge Fund Industry
- Private Equity & Private Debt
  - Buyout
  - Private Equity Investing
  - Venture Capital & Growth Equity
  - Credit Risk and Credit Derivatives
  - Insurance Linked Strategies
  - Introduction to Structuring
  - Private Credit and Asset Based Strategies
  - Private Credit and Cash Based Strategies
- Digital Assets
  - Allocating to Cryptocurrencies
  - Distributed Ledger Technology
- Funds of Funds
  - Funds of Funds

The CAIA Association recommends that candidates devote 200 or more hours of study to prepare for the Level I exam.

=== Level II ===
The CAIA Level II exam consists of 100 multiple-choice questions, plus three sets of constructed response (essay) questions. Candidates must apply the skills and knowledge from Level I to gain a deeper understanding of issues involved in each of the areas of alternative investments. The Level II curriculum covers nine topics, listed below.

The Level II curriculum covers:

- Emerging Topics
  - Digital Assets: Bitcoin, Web 3.0, and DeFi
  - Private Equity: Value Creation in Private Equity, and Forecasting Returns
  - Portfolio Management: Rebalancing Illiquid Portfolios, Managing Liquidity for Capital Calls, and Assessing Long Term Performance
  - and more...
- CAIA Ethical Principles
  - Ethics
  - Professionalism and Fiduciary Responsibilities
- Institutional Asset Owners
- Family Offices and the Family Office Model
- Foundations and the Endowment Model
- Pension Fund Portfolio Management
- Sovereign Wealth Funds
- Types of Asset Owners and the IPS
- Asset Allocation
  - Active Management
  - Asset Allocation Processes and MVO
  - Other Asset Allocation Approaches
  - Rebalancing Strategies
  - Total Portfolio Approach
- Risk and Risk Management
  - Applied Benchmarking
  - Benchmarking and Performance Attribution
  - Hedging Portfolios
  - Liquidity and Funding Risks
  - Risk Measurement, Risk Management, and Risk Systems
- Methods and Models
  - Directional Strategies and Methods
  - Modeling Overview and Fixed Income Models
  - Multi-Factor Equity Pricing Models
  - Multivariate Empirical Methods and Performance Persistence
  - Relative Value Methods
  - Valuation and Hedging Using Binomial Trees
  - Valuation Methods for Private Assets: The Case of Real Estate
- Accessing Alternative Investments
  - Access to Real Assets
  - Diversified Access to Hedge Funds
  - Hedge Fund Replication
  - The Risk and Performance of Private and Listed Assets
- Due Diligence & Selecting Managers
  - Cases in Tail Risk
  - Due Diligence of Terms and Business Activities
  - Investment Process Due Diligence
  - Operational Due Diligence
  - Selection of a Fund Manager
- Volatility and Complex Strategies
  - Complexity and Structured Products
  - Complexity and the Case of Cross-Border Real Estate Investing
  - Cryptocurrency Investing and Trading
  - Volatility as a Factor Exposure
  - Volatility, Correlation, and Dispersion Products and Strategies
- Universal Investment Considerations
  - Geopolitics
  - Global Regulation
  - Professionalism and Fiduciary Responsibilities
  - Sustainability Analysis and Application
  - Sustainability and Alternative Investments

The CAIA Association recommends that candidates devote 200 or more hours of study to prepare for the Level II exam.

=== Historical pass rates ===
Grading begins once the examination window is closed, and Level I results are posted within three weeks after the final examination day. Level II exam results are available within six weeks after the last exam day, due to the need to grade essay questions.

The percentage of candidates that pass the CAIA exams changes from exam to exam.

	2026	2025		2024		2023		2022		2021		2020		2019		2018		2017		2016		2015		2014		2013		2012		2011		2010		2009		2008		2007		2006	
	March	Sept.	March	Sept.	March	Sept.	March	Sept.	March	Sept.	March	Sept.	March	Sept.	March	Sept.	March	Sept.	March	Sept.	March	Sept.	March	Sept.	March	Sept.	March	Sept.	March	Sept.	March	Sept.	March	Sept.	March	Sept.	March	Sept.	March	Sept.	Feb.
Level I	45%	46%	48%	45%	46%	48%	45%	49%	49%	51%	54%	52%	54%	52%	54%	54%	64%	60%	63%	61%	59%	66%	66%	67%	67%	68%	68%	64%	68%	74%	71%	71%	72%	68%	73%	72%	72%	72%	76%	79%	75%
Level II	64%	60%	62%	60%	59%	65%	61%	57%	58%	58%	59%	65%	81%	64%	69%	62%	58%	57%	59%	66%	70%	67%	68%	66%	63%	62%	65%	62%	58%	59%	58%	56%	56%	58%	62%	70%	69%	65%	67%	63%	65%

Candidates may augment their study of the CAIA curriculum materials with third-party preparation programs. Those programs are offered by: AFI Escuela de Finanzas - Spain; Alpha Business School – Sri Lanka; Artificially Educated – United Kingdom; Berkeley Middle East Training – United Arab Emirates; Center for Business Studies - Switzerland; Edge Designations – South Africa; Escuela FEF – Spain, FK Partners - Brazil; Kaplan Financial – Hong Kong; Kaplan UK – United Kingdom; Kaplan Schweser – USA; Top Finance – France; Upper Mark, Inc. – USA.

== Chapters ==
Once the program and eligibility requirements have been met, CAIA Members are able to join Chapters. There are 35 CAIA Chapters around the world. Chapter activities include educational panels with expert speakers and deliver on CAIA's mission to educate Candidates and Members about relevant topics in alternatives.

== See also ==
- The Chartered Financial Analyst designation of the CFA Institute
- Certified International Investment Analyst
- The Financial Risk Manager (FRM) international professional certification offered by the Global Association of Risk Professionals
- The Certified Management Accountant certification offered by Institute of Management Accountants.
- The Professional Risk Manager (PRM) certification offered by the PRMIA
- The Certificate in Investment Performance Measurement designation of the CFA Institute
- The Chartered Insurance Professional designation of the Insurance Institute of Canada
