= List of post-nominal letters (Ireland) =

This is a list of post-nominal letters given in Ireland. Most are used by custom rather than arising from any legislation.

== List ==
Office	Post-nominal
Orders and Decorations
Military Medal for Gallantry	MMG
Distinguished Service Medal	DSM
Legal Positions
Senior Counsel	SC
Peace Commissioner	PC
University Degrees (Note: The exact post-nominal for university degrees varies based on the faculty in which the degree was obtained)
Doctorate	DD, LLD, DLitt, LittD, DMus, MusD, DSc, ScD, DMed, DPhil, PhD, DBA, DSocSci, EngD, EdD, STD, etc.
Master's Degree	MA, MComm, MSc, MSci, MPhil, MLitt, MRes, MEng, MSocSc, MTh, LLM, PgD, MMath, MAcc, MFin, MBA, MEd, MEnt, MEd, PME, STL etc.
Bachelor's Degree	BA, BSc, LLB, BCL, BComm, BEng, BE, BAI, BArch, BD, BTh, BDes, BBS, BEd, BMusEd, STB, etc.
University Diplomas
Higher Diploma	HDip
Postgraduate Diploma	PgD, PGDCCI(open), DCH, etc.
Diploma of Higher Education/Certificate of Higher Education	DipHE/CertHE
University Alumni
University College Cork	(NUI)
University College Dublin	(NUI)
University of Limerick	(Limerick)
University of Dublin (Trinity College)	(Dubl. - Dublinensis)
Dublin City University	(Dub City)
University of Galway	(NUI)
Maynooth University	(NUI)
St. Patricks College, Maynooth (Pontifical University)	(Maynooth)
Munster Technological University	(MTU)
Legal Qualifications
Bachelor's Degrees	BCL, DipLaw/CPE
Barrister at Law Degree	BL
Master's Degrees	LLM, LLB, MCL, MJur
Diploma in Legal Studies	DipLegalStud
Doctorate	DPhil, PhD, LLD
Honorary Doctorate	DCL (Hon), LLD (Hon)
Medical Qualifications
Medicine	MB BCh BAO, BM BS, MD, etc.
Surgery	MRCS, FRCSI, MS, MCh, etc.
Physicians	MRCPI, FRCPI, MRCPath, MRCPsych etc.
EMTs/Paramedics/Advanced Paramedics	NQEMT (EMT/Paramedic/Advanced Paramedic), Dip EMS Paramedic, PGDip EMS Advanced Paramedic, MSc Advanced Paramedic
Licentiates in Medicine and Surgery	LRCPI, LRCSI, LAH, etc.
Anaesthetists	MCAI, FCAI, FJICMI etc.
Biomedical Scientists (UK) or Medical Scientist (Ireland)	LIBMS, MIBMS, FIBMS, CSci (UK) or MACSLM, FACSLM (Ireland)
Nursing	BSc (Cur), BN
General Practitioners	MICGP, FRCGP
Pre-hospital Care Physicians	DipIMC RCSEd, FIMC RCSEd
Emergency Physicians	MRCEM, FRCEM
Physiotherapy	DPT, MCSP, FCSP, SRP, etc.
Occupational therapy	MAOTI
Pharmacists	MPSI,
Veterinary Nurses	VN, RVN
Veterinary Surgeons	MVB, MRCVS, FRCVS
Therapy Qualifications
Doctoral Degree	PhD, MD, PsyD, DMin
Master's Degree	MSW, MEd, MSEd, MSc, MA, EdS, MDiv, PgD
Licences	LPC, LMHC, LCPC, LPCC, LRTTP, LRTTT, LCMHC, LMHP, MFCC, LCSW
Certifications	CADC, C.Hyp, Cl.Hyp, RTT
Accreditations and Memberships	IACP, NCP, ICP, IAHIP, CHPA, GHSC, BACP, UKCP, BPA, EAP, BPS, ARCHTI, NAPCP, FICTA, NHR, IHR, IAPTP
Teaching Qualifications
Postgraduate Certificate in Education	PGCE
Professional Master of Education	PME
Postgraduate Diploma in Education	PGDE
Graduate Diploma in Education	GDEd
Higher Diploma in Education	HDipEd
Bachelor of Education	BEd
National Teacher	NT
Engineering Qualifications
European Engineer	EurIng
Chartered Engineer	CEng
Associate Engineer	AEng
Engineering Technician	EngTech
Information Technology Qualifications
Chartered IT Professional	CITP
Financial Services Qualifications
CFA Charterholder (CFA Institute)	CFA
Fellow of the Institute of Actuaries	FIA
Chartered Accountant	ACA, FCA
Chartered Certified Accountant(ACCA)	ACCA, FCCA
Certified Public Accountant	CPA
Chartered Institute of Management Accountants (CIMA)	ACMA, FCMA
Accounting Technician (Accounting Technicians Ireland - formerly called IATI)	MIATI
Professional Risk Manager (PRIMA)	PRM
Financial Risk Manager (GARP)	FRM
Qualified Financial Advisor	QFA
Fellowship and Membership of Learned Societies (Note: There are too many religious institutes, learned societies, royal academies, and professional institutions to be listed. One example is provided in each case; the format shown should be followed for other organisations, except that the initials of the organisation should be substituted.) (Note: Most institutions awarding Fellowships also award memberships. For example, whilst FRAeS is the highest award of the Royal Aeronautical Society, CRAeS (Companion) is an equivalent status but not also including professional qualifications, MRAeS is a professionally qualified member, and AMRAeS is an associate member — reflecting a lower level of professional qualification. This pattern is common, but not universal and specific post-nominals can vary between societies.)
Member of the Academy of Clinical Science & Laboratory Medicine	MACSLM
Fellow of the Academy of Clinical Science & Laboratory Medicine	FACSLM
Member of the Institute of Archaeologists of Ireland	MIAI
Member of the Royal Irish Academy	MRIA
Member of the Engineers Ireland	MIEI
Member of the Irish Computer Society	MICS
Member of the Royal College of Surgeons in Ireland	MRCSI
Member of the Genealogical Society of Ireland	MGSI
Fellow of the Royal Academy of Medicine of Ireland	FRAMI
Member of the Royal Hibernian Academy	MRHA
Member of the Royal Institute of the Architects of Ireland	MRIAI
Member of the Royal Society of Antiquaries of Ireland	MSAI
Member of the Royal Dublin Society	MRDS
Member of the Honorable Society of King's Inns	MHSKI
Member of the Institute of Designers in Ireland	MIDI
Registered Member of the Archives and Records Association, Ireland	RMARA
Registered Member or Fellow of the Parental Alienation Awareness Association	MPAAA, FPAAA
Technician Member of Engineers Ireland	TechIEI
Fellow of Engineers Ireland	FIEI
Fellow of Irish Computer Society	FICS
Fellow of the Royal Anthropological Institute of Great Britain and Ireland	FRAI
Fellow of the Irish Guild of Organists and Choristers	FIGOC
Fellow of Trinity College Dublin	FTCD
Scholar of Trinity College	Sch
Member of the Public Relations Institute of Ireland	MPRII
Member of the Irish Society of Cinematographers	ISC
Legislators
A Teachta Dála	TD
Member of the European Parliament	MEP
Church Titles
Church Curate	CC
Parish Priest	PP
Vicar general	VG
Religious Institutes
Canons Regular	CR + Initials of specific Congregation e.g. CRIC
Praemonstratensians (or "Norbertines")	OPraem
Order of St Benedict ("Benedictines")	OSB
Order of Cistercians	OCist
Trappists	OCSO
Order of Preachers ("Dominicans" or "Blackfriars") Ordinis Praedicatorum	OP
Conventual Franciscans ("Franciscans" or "Greyfriars")	OFM Conv.
Capuchins Franciscans ("Capuchins")	OFM Cap.
Order of Friars Minor ("Franciscans")	OFM
Order of Saint Clare ("Poor Clares")	OSC
Order of Saint Augustine ("Augustinians")	OSA
Carmelites of the Ancient Observance ("Carmelites" or "Whitefriars")	OCarm
Discalced Carmelites	OCD
Order of Servants of Mary ("Servites")	OSM
Brothers Hospitallers of St John of God ("St John of God Brothers")	OH
Society of Jesus ("Jesuits")	SJ
Institute of the Blessed Virgin Mary ("Loreto Sisters")	IBVM
Vincentians	CM
Daughters of Charity	DC
Congregation of the Most Holy Redeemer ("Redemptorists")	CSsR
Congregation of the Passion ("Passionists")	CP
Congregatio Sancti Spiritus Holy Ghost Fathers	CSSp
Salesians	SDB
Society of the Divine Savior Salvatorians	SDB
Society of Mary ("Marists")	SM
Marist Brothers	FMS
Fratres Scholarum Christianorum ("De La Salle Brothers")	FSC
Religious Sisters of Mercy ("Mercy Sisters")	RSM
Religious Sisters of Charity ("Irish Sisters of Charity")	RSC
Presentation Sisters	IPBVM
Congregatio Fratrum Christianorum ("Congregation of Christian Brothers")	CFC
Society of St Columban ("Columban Fathers")	SSC or SSCME
Missionary Society of St Patrick ("Kiltegan Fathers")	SPS
Society of African Missions	SMA
Celtic Cross Missionary	CCM

== See also ==
- Orders, decorations, and medals of the Republic of Ireland
- Awards and decorations of the Irish Defence Forces
