= Certified Risk Analyst =

Certified Risk Analyst (CRA) is a risk management professional designation offered by the Global Academy of Finance and Management (GAFM). CRA risk management training and certification is available in New York, California, Asia, the Middle East, and other locations.

"CRA" is a graduate post-nominal designation that is available for risk managers with (i) an accredited master's degree, law degree, MBA, CPA, PhD, or specialized executive training, as well as (ii) "substantial experience in risk assessment and management on a regional and global level" in parallel

== See also ==
Certifications

- Chartered Financial Analyst (CFA)
- Certified Risk Professional (MIRM designation; ERM focused)
- Chartered Enterprise Risk Actuary (CERA; Institute and Faculty of Actuaries credential)
- Chartered Enterprise Risk Analyst (CERA; Society of Actuaries credential)
- Financial Risk Manager (FRM)
- Professional Risk Manager (PRM)

Institutions

- American Risk and Insurance Association
- Global Association of Risk Professionals
- Institute of Risk Management
- Risk and Insurance Management Society
- Professional Risk Managers' International Association
