= Michael Farrell (activist) =

Irish civil rights activist and human rights lawyer (born 1944)

Member of the European Commission against Racism and Intolerance
- In office 24 November 2011 – July 2025

Council of State of Ireland
- In office 6 January 2012 – 10 November 2018
- Appointed by: Michael D. Higgins

Member of the Irish Human Rights Commission
- In office 2001–2011

Personal details
- Born: 1944 (age 81–82) Magherafelt, County Londonderry
- Party: People's Democracy
- Education: Queen's University Belfast (BA); University of Strathclyde (MSc); Dublin Institute of Technology (DipLegalStud); Law Society of Ireland
- Occupation: Human rights lawyer, writer
- Profession: Lecturer (1968–1981); Journalist (1981–1993); Solicitor (1993–2015)

Michael Farrell (born 1944) is an Irish human rights lawyer, civil rights activist, journalist and writer. He was a leading figure in the Queen's University-based People's Democracy (PD) during the Northern Ireland civil rights movement of the late 1960s and 1970s, and was interned without trial in 1971 before undertaking a hunger strike while imprisoned two years later.

After relocating to Dublin in 1981, Farrell worked as a journalist before qualifying as a solicitor in 1993 and building a career in public interest law. He was, among other things, the first Irish lawyer to bring a case before the UN Human Rights Committee, and he acted for many years for Dr Lydia Foy in her campaign for legal recognition of her gender.

He served as a member of the Irish Human Rights Commission, as a nominee of President Michael D. Higgins to the Council of State, and as the Irish member of the Council of Europe's European Commission against Racism and Intolerance (ECRI), a body from which he resigned in July 2025 in protest at its refusal to take a position on Gaza war. In 2022 he was awarded an honorary doctorate of laws by University College Dublin in recognition of his contribution to Irish public life, including his part in the introduction of the State's gender recognition laws.

== Early life ==
Farrell was born in Magherafelt, County Londonderry, in 1944, the youngest of three sons of Tom and Helen Farrell. Both of his parents were from County Mayo and moved to Magherafelt in 1938 after his father, who worked for the National Bank, was transferred there. His parents disliked the sectarian divisions of Northern Ireland but did not discuss politics at home. He was educated at St Patrick's College, Armagh, and briefly considered a religious vocation, but returned home after six months following doubts about his suitability.

In 1961 Farrell spent time volunteering in London with the Legion of Mary, working at a kiosk in Euston station assisting young emigrants arriving from Ireland; he later said the poverty he witnessed there contributed to his move ideologically towards socialism. He entered Queen's University Belfast in 1962 to study English. His early time at Queen's was marked by the deaths of both of his parents within his first six months there. He met his future wife, Órla, in his first week at the university, and the couple married two years later.

== Education and student politics ==
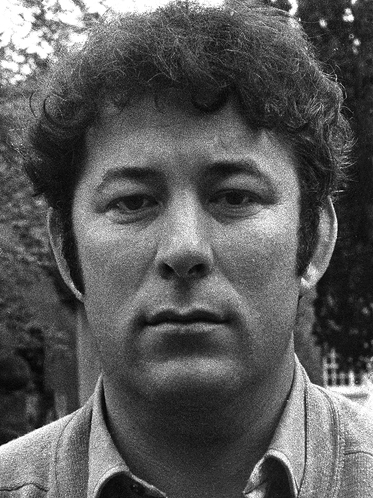
Farrell credits Seamus Heaney (seen here in 1970) with helping him finish his degree at Queens

Farrell earned a Bachelor of Arts (BA) in English at Queen's University Belfast and later a Master of Science (MSc) in Politics at the University of Strathclyde. His studies took a back seat to his activism, and he became a prominent student figure, serving as vice-president of the Union of Students in Ireland and joining the university's Labour society and anti-apartheid movement. His lecturers included a fellow native of County Londonderry, the poet Seamus Heaney, whom Farrell has credited with helping to ensure he completed his degree. Queen's was, in Farrell's own recollection, a conservative institution at the time, but he and a small core of activists, including fellow Derry man Eamonn McCann, worked to change that.

By this period Farrell was a Labour Trotskyist, having earlier been connected, along with other future People's Democracy leaders such as Cyril Toman, Rory McShane and Fergus Keogh, to the Irish Workers' Group.

== Civil rights movement and People's Democracy ==
=== Formation of People's Democracy ===
On 5 October 1968 the Royal Ulster Constabulary (RUC) broke up a civil rights march in Derry. Four days later, students at Queen's University Belfast, including Farrell, held a sit-down protest outside the Guildhall in Derry, and the loosely organised movement that became People's Democracy (PD) developed from this response. A contemporary account in Magill magazine noted that People's Democracy had no constitution, committee or official spokesperson, and that meetings could be called, and attended, by anyone. Former members of the Irish Workers' Group, including Farrell, came to dominate the movement's early meetings owing to their experience with left-wing organising and procedural tactics.

=== Belfast to Derry march and Burntollet Bridge ===
In January 1969 People's Democracy organised a four-day march from Belfast to Derry, modelled by Farrell's own account on the Selma to Montgomery march of 1965. Farrell acted as a spokesman for the march; interviewed by RTÉ on its third day, he defended the chosen route and criticised the level of police protection provided, saying marchers intended to continue to Derry despite the overnight destruction of a statue in Toome by opponents of the march.

On 4 January the marchers were ambushed at Burntollet Bridge by around 200 loyalists, including off-duty members of the B Specials; thirteen marchers required hospital treatment. Farrell was struck by a brick and knocked unconscious and his wife, Órla, was also hit. The subsequent Cameron Report found that available police forces had not provided adequate protection to marchers at Burntollet and in Derry, and that instances of police indiscipline had provoked serious hostility, particularly among the Catholic population of the city. Writing later in the Irish Examiner, Anthony Coughlan noted that the Cameron Report had characterised the Burntollet march as "a coat-trailing exercise" (meaning a deliberate act or provocative display designed to anger opponents, incite a reaction, or start a fight).

Reacting to the Cameron Report's publication in September 1969, Farrell described it as "very timid", although he acknowledged that it criticised the Northern Ireland government. He denied any organisational connection to the Revolutionary Socialist Student Federation in England named in the report, while acknowledging that the group had previously assisted People's Democracy, and rejected the report's implication that he favoured violence. Farrell said he believed the commission had made him a scapegoat so that responsibility would not fall solely on the government.

Farrell later recalled that he and fellow activists had travelled directly from an anti-Vietnam War protest outside Belfast City Hall to the first civil rights march, from Coalisland to Dungannon on 24 August 1968, changing the slogans on their placards along the way.

=== NICRA executive and the 1969 election ===
At its annual general meeting in January 1969, Farrell, along with Eamonn McCann, Cyril Toman and Kevin Boyle, was elected to the executive of the Northern Ireland Civil Rights Association (NICRA). Farrell and Boyle subsequently proposed an unstewarded march to Stormont through the loyalist Newtownards Road area of east Belfast. The proposal prompted the resignation of several more moderate members of the executive, including Betty Sinclair, secretary of the Belfast Trades Council, who felt People's Democracy had pushed the Protestant community too hard. Farrell stood as the People's Democracy candidate for Bannside in the 1969 Northern Ireland general election, finishing third behind Terence O'Neill and Ian Paisley. In the same election, Magill magazine noted, People's Democracy candidates elsewhere polled roughly a third of the vote where they stood against Nationalist Party candidates.

=== Internment and hunger strike ===
Farrell was interned without trial for six weeks from 9 August 1971. Soldiers broke into his south Belfast home in the early hours of the morning; he called out to reassure his wife before being taken, half-dressed and barefoot, to Girdwood Barracks along with more than a hundred other men. He was made to run across an area strewn with rubble and broken glass while being beaten by soldiers and set upon by dogs, and was ordered to stand in a marked box and sing the British national anthem, which he refused to do. Of the experience, he later said: "This is fascism". Farrell has said he later obtained a British government document, marked secret, indicating that the RUC had recommended People's Democracy members be included among those interned as posing a "special threat".

Imprisoned for breach of the peace in 1973, Farrell and fellow People's Democracy member Tony Canavan went on hunger strike demanding political status. The strike lasted thirty-four days before they were released along with around a hundred other prisoners. Farrell has since said the introduction of internment turned the civil rights movement into "a sectarian thing", pushing communities back towards more entrenched positions and allowing the national question to displace concerns about human rights and equality.

== Journalism ==
By the early 1980s Farrell has said the space for political activity in Northern Ireland had narrowed considerably amid ongoing violence, and in 1981 he and his family moved to Dublin. There he worked as a freelance subeditor with The Irish Times, then with Magill, and subsequently as a staff journalist with the Irish Press. He reported on cases of Irish people wrongly convicted in England, including the Guildford Four, the Birmingham Six and Judith Ward, who had been jailed after confessing to a 1974 IRA bombing in England that killed twelve people, including two children. Farrell has said he spoke to the woman responsible for planting the bomb, who told him Ward had had no involvement in either the bombing or the IRA. As a journalist for Magill, he interviewed Sinn Féin vice-president Gerry Adams in June 1983 about the party's electoral strategy and its relationship with the IRA's armed campaign.

During this period Farrell also published several books on Northern Ireland's political history, including Northern Ireland: The Orange State (1976) and Arming the Protestants (1983), a study of the formation of the Ulster Special Constabulary and the RUC between 1920 and 1927 that was based on his master's thesis. Farrell also campaigned against political censorship under Section 31 of the Broadcasting Act in Ireland, and in the 1980s campaigned for the release of victims of miscarriages of justice in England and the Republic of Ireland, including the Birmingham Six.

== Legal career ==
=== Qualification and early practice ===
Farrell's interest in the law grew out of his work on wrongful conviction cases and his view that legislation could be used to remedy injustice, particularly in relation to discrimination. He studied for a Diploma in Legal Studies at the Dublin Institute of Technology and qualified as a solicitor through the Law Society of Ireland in 1993. He joined the Dublin criminal defence firm ME Hanahoe's, where his work included cases before the Special Criminal Court and libel actions against United Kingdom media outlets that continued to disparage the Birmingham Six and Guildford Four after their release, as well as work pursuing compensation for survivors of Mother and Baby homes.

=== Irish Council for Civil Liberties ===
Farrell was co-chairperson of the Irish Council for Civil Liberties (ICCL) from 1995 to 2001. In the late 1990s Farrell and others raised funding, including from the Ford Foundation, the Joseph Rowntree Trust and, later, Atlantic Philanthropies, which contributed some €3 million over five years, allowing the ICCL to employ paid staff for the first time since its establishment in 1976. As co-chair, Farrell was involved in campaigning for the incorporation of the European Convention on Human Rights into domestic law in both jurisdictions on the island of Ireland, and for the establishment of human rights commissions north and south as part of the Good Friday Agreement, working closely with the Belfast-based Committee on the Administration of Justice.

=== Irish Human Rights Commission ===
Farrell was appointed a member of the Irish Human Rights Commission in 2001 and was reappointed in October 2006, serving until 2011. In 2005 he was also appointed to the Steering Committee of the National Action Plan Against Racism.

=== Free Legal Advice Centres ===
Farrell was a senior solicitor with Free Legal Advice Centres (FLAC) between 2005 and 2015, and has brought cases to the European Court of Human Rights and the UN Human Rights Committee. He was the first Irish lawyer to bring a case before the UN Human Rights Committee on behalf of a client, successfully arguing in Kavanagh v Ireland (1998) that his client had not been treated equally before the law under Article 26 of the International Covenant on Civil and Political Rights. In Quinn v Ireland (2000) before the European Court of Human Rights, he successfully argued that his client's right to silence and privilege against self-incrimination had been violated. In 2009 he successfully challenged the exclusion of asylum seekers from social welfare entitlements before the Social Welfare Appeals Office, contributing to a wider campaign against the direct provision system. He was also involved in litigation challenging the exclusion of deaf people from jury service.

At FLAC, Farrell described much of his work as "strategic litigation": cases in which he balanced the interests of an individual client against the wider implications a favourable ruling might carry, citing as examples his work securing child benefit payments for children in the direct provision system and appeals against refusals of social welfare payments. Following his retirement from FLAC in 2015, Farrell delivered the organisation's annual Dave Ellis Memorial Lecture, titled "Using the Law to Secure Social Justice", in which he argued that the Irish Constitution did not adequately protect economic and social rights, and called on candidates in the 2016 Irish general election to commit to a referendum on inserting such rights into the Constitution.

==== The Lydia Foy case ====
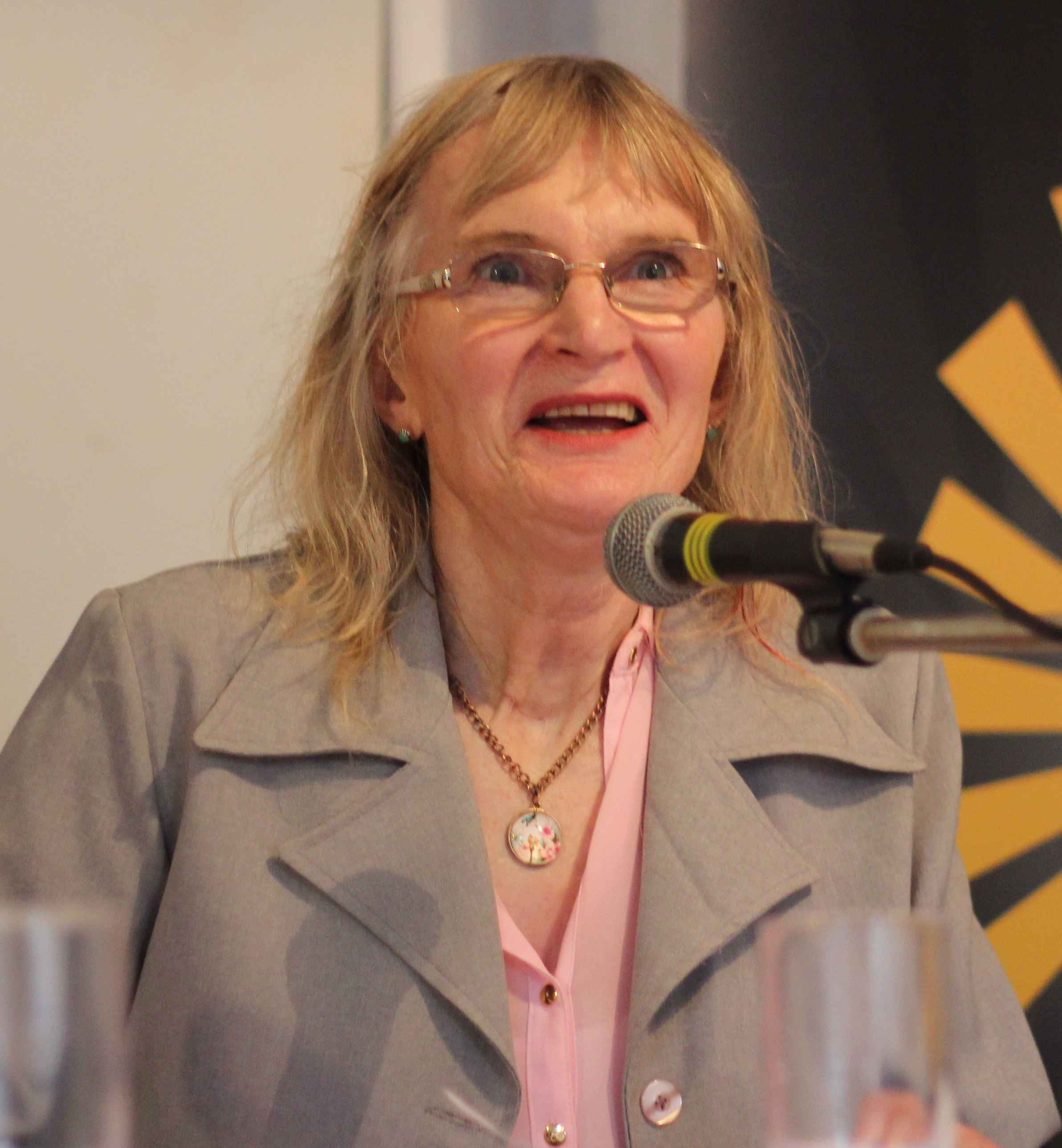
One of the most significant law cases Farrell undertook was on behalf of Lydia Foy.

One of Farrell's highest-profile cases was that of Dr Lydia Foy, who first went to court in 1997, with FLAC's support, seeking a birth certificate recording her as female. In 2007 the High Court ruled that the State's failure to legislate for the recognition of transgender people breached the European Convention on Human Rights, but Foy had to return to court some years later after the government failed to act on the ruling. Following the passage of the Gender Recognition Act 2015, Foy received a birth certificate recording her correct gender. Reflecting on the eighteen years the case had taken from start to finish, Farrell later said: "How many cases like that can you do in a lifetime?". He has also said that the remedy available under the European Convention on Human Rights Act 2003 remains inadequate, since its only sanction for state non-compliance is damages, and has argued that government should be obliged to respond to adverse court rulings within a set timeframe.

== Council of State ==
In January 2012 Farrell, then senior solicitor with FLAC, was nominated by President Michael D. Higgins to the Irish Council of State, one of seven presidential nominees announced alongside former Supreme Court judge Catherine McGuinness, academics Deirdre Heenan and Gearóid Ó Tuathaigh, community activist Ruairí McKiernan, emigrant rights campaigner Sally Mulready and disability law academic Gerard Quinn.

== European Commission against Racism and Intolerance ==
Farrell was appointed the Irish member of the European Commission against Racism and Intolerance (ECRI) in 2011 and was reappointed for a second term in 2016. ECRI is the independent human rights monitoring body of the Council of Europe, an institution distinct from the European Union. Over his fourteen years on the commission, Farrell served at various points as its vice-chair and chaired its working group, later task force, on LGBTI rights.

=== Resignation over Gaza ===
In July 2025 Farrell resigned from ECRI, citing the commission's refusal to adopt a position on the war in Gaza. He said he had tried unsuccessfully on several occasions over an eighteen-month period to raise the issue at ECRI meetings, before formally proposing a motion at the commission's plenary meeting in early July 2025. The motion, which Farrell described as deliberately moderate, called for Israel to end its attacks and allow food and aid into Gaza under the oversight of international bodies, and for Hamas to release its remaining hostages. Following two days of debate the motion was not adopted; the commission's leadership maintained that the situation fell outside ECRI's mandate, a position Farrell rejected on the grounds that several Council of Europe member states were supplying weapons used in the conflict. A spokesperson for the ECRI secretariat said the commission was mandated to monitor state action against racism and related discrimination within Europe, and that the situation in the Middle East had not been considered by ECRI members to fall within that mandate.

Speaking to The Irish Times, Farrell said: "It certainly is a genocide". He said a small number of fellow commission members privately shared his view but were reluctant to speak out publicly, in some cases because they worked for organisations dependent on state funding. In a later interview, Farrell said he believed Israel had lobbied extensively within the Council of Europe, and that larger member states, which he regarded as broadly sympathetic to Israel's position, held disproportionate influence within the organisation. In his resignation statement, he said: "I am sorry to have to leave ECRI, which has done good work". The motion had been tabled several weeks after the Council of Europe's secretary general, Alain Berset, had publicly expressed concern about the situation in Gaza.

== Honours ==
In September 2022 Farrell was awarded an honorary Doctor of Laws by University College Dublin in recognition of his contribution to Irish public life, in particular his role in the introduction of the State's gender recognition laws. The degree was conferred on 6 September 2022 during the university's annual conferring of degrees to law graduates, with Dr Lydia Foy among those present. Delivering the citation, Dr Liam Thornton of the UCD Sutherland School of Law highlighted Farrell's role in Kavanagh v Ireland and Quinn v Ireland, and concluded that an impartial observer would judge Farrell to have been one of Ireland's most important public interest lawyers of the preceding two decades. Accepting the award, Farrell said: "I'm very honoured to be awarded the degree of doctor of laws by UCD". He used the occasion to encourage law graduates to consider working, even temporarily, with non-governmental organisations engaged in human rights and equality work.

== Political views ==
=== Socialism and analysis of Northern Ireland ===
Farrell was, by his own description, a Labour Trotskyist during his student years, having earlier been associated with the Irish Workers' Group. Reacting to the Cameron Report in 1969, he said he believed in the creation of a socialist republic in Ireland, and rejected the report's suggestion that he favoured the use of violence. In a 1977 essay for the Socialist Register, titled Northern Ireland: An Anti-Imperialist Struggle, Farrell set out a Marxist analysis of the conflict, arguing that partition and the Northern Ireland state had served the interests of British imperialism and had been sustained through British military and financial support. He described the Northern Ireland state established in 1921 as "viciously reactionary and highly sectarian". Farrell argued that Ulster unionism represented not a movement for self-determination but the defence of a system of relative privilege enjoyed by Protestant workers over their Catholic counterparts, and he called for the withdrawal of British troops and the eventual development of a socialist republic uniting workers of both traditions. According to journalist Susan McKay, People's Democracy, while more militant in its tactics than NICRA, remained committed to non-violent methods throughout this period.

Farrell has said he would personally like to see a united Ireland, but as of 2025 did not consider a referendum on the question advisable in the short term, citing the risk that it might fail to pass and could prove divisive amid political instability and pressure from right-wing movements in Britain. He has said considerable hurt remains from the Troubles, and that work is needed to reassure the Protestant community that its concerns would be addressed in a united Ireland.

=== Human rights, Brexit and the European Convention ===
In 2025, Farrell expressed concern about pressure within British politics, particularly from the Conservative Party, to withdraw the United Kingdom from the European Convention on Human Rights, arguing that this would have a serious effect in Northern Ireland given the centrality of human rights protections to the Good Friday Agreement. He has also criticised the Labour government led by Keir Starmer, saying it had repeatedly given ground to pressure from the political right. Reflecting on developments since the 1990s, Farrell has said that a long period of progress on human rights, marked by instruments such as the ECHR and the establishment of national human rights and equality bodies, now appeared to be going into reverse: "Now, we seem to be galloping backwards".

=== Israel-Palestine conflict ===
Since 2023 Farrell has been a public critic of Israel's military campaign in Gaza, which he has characterised as a genocide, and has taken part in demonstrations against it. His resignation from ECRI in 2025 (see § European Commission against Racism and Intolerance) reflected this position, as did his broader criticism of European governments and institutions for what he regarded as insufficient action on the conflict.

== Personal life ==
Farrell met his wife, Órla, in his first week at Queen's University Belfast, and the couple married two years later. Órla Farrell was herself active in the civil rights movement, including in the organisation of a response to the introduction of internment in 1971. The couple's two children were born during the 1970s, while Farrell was working as a lecturer at a technical college in Belfast.

== Published works ==
- Northern Ireland: The Orange State. Pluto Press. 1976. ISBN 0-902818-87-2. (books.google.com.au)
- Farrell, Michael (1977). "Northern Ireland: An Anti-Imperialist Struggle". Socialist Register. Vol. 14.
- The Magill Book of Irish Politics (1981) ISBN 0-9507659-0-2
- Arming the Protestants (1983) ISBN 0-86104-705-2
- Sheltering the Fugitive (1986) ISBN 0-85342-750-X
- Emergency Legislation: Apparatus of Repression (1986) ISBN 0-946755-12-4
- Twenty Years On (1988) (editor) ISBN 0-86322-097-5
