= Nicolas Ziebarth =

Tenured Professor at Cornell University, Head of Research Unit at ZEW Mannheim

Nicolas Robert Ziebarth (born May 25 1982 in Frankfurt, Germany) is a university professor at the University of Mannheim and the ZEW- the Leibniz Centre for European Economic Research. Since 2022, he is head of their Research Unit "Labour Markets and Social Insurance." Since its founding in 2021, he served as a tenured Associate Professor in Cornell's Brooks School of Public Policy and the Department of Economics. Prior to that, he was an Assistant Professor (2011-2017) and then tenured Associate Professor (2017-2021) in Cornell's Department of Policy Analysis and Management.

His research studies the interaction of social insurance systems with population health and labor markets. In particular, he is a leading international expert on the economics of sick leave. His work has been influential in shaping policy creation, especially in the wake of the COVID-19 pandemic: his research is cited as key reasoning for the Healthy Families Act, the initial FFCRA emergency sick leave provision, and its extension. He is currently ranked by RePEc as #68 of all 31,386 registered economists worldwide with less than 15 years of research activity and #8 in the cohort of 2011 graduates.

Ziebarth also supports the education of students globally through his teaching. From 2011 to 2022, taught courses in Cornell's Sloan Program in Health Administration, the Department of Economics and the College of Human Ecology. Furthermore, he served as an associate director of the interdisciplinary Cornell Institute for Healthy Futures and as a research associate for the National Bureau of Economic Research (NBER).

Since 2022, he has also held a position as a senior editor at the Journal of Risk and Insurance.

Ziebarth is the author of many publications, a sampling of which is below.

== Education ==
Nicolas Ziebarth received the German equivalent ("Vordiplom") of bachelor's degrees in (i) economics and business as well as (ii) economics education from Humboldt University in Berlin (HU Berlin) in 2003. He earned the equivalent of two master's degrees ("Diplom") in (i) economics as well as (ii) business studies from the University of Technology Berlin (TU Berlin). He was a member of the first PhD program Graduate Center cohort of the German Institute for Economic Research (DIW Berlin) from 2006 to 2011. During this time, he was member of the German Socio-Economic Panel Study (SOEP) department. His dissertation, supervised by Gert G. Wagner and Regina T. Riphahn, entitled "Sickness Absence and Economic Incentives", was awarded the 2011 Upjohn Institute Dissertation Award. Dr. Ziebarth received his PHD in economics from TU/DIW Berlin in 2011.

== Research Interests ==
Professor Ziebarth's research focuses on the economics of paid sick leave. While he has also published papers on health insurance, risky behavior, and measurement of health, he is a principal social scientists producing a stream of policy-relevant, causally identified research on the consequences of sick pay mandates. Dr. Ziebarth started his research on sick leave during his PhD in 2007 in Germany. Since 2010, he has published more than a dozen peer-reviewed papers on sick leave in economic and policy journals. Several of these papers study the consequences of US state-level mandates for employee behavior, analyze their impact on take-up and coverage, and investigate their relevance for labor costs, job creation, wage dynamics and unintended consequences such as crowd-out of non-mandated benefits

With coauthors, he studied the relevance of sick pay coverage on presenteeism behavior ("working when sick") and the spread of infectious disease. In the last several years, his research in this area has been featured in prominent publications such as the New York Times, the Washington Post, the Wall Street Journal and the Economist.

== Awards ==
Since 2022, Ziebarth has been ranked as a top economist by IDEAS RePc (named in the top 0.2% of young economists, top 10% in health economists, and #8 in the 2011 graduate cohort). He was also given the Early Career Scholarly Achievement Award by American Risk and Insurance Association, ranked #12 in the Handelsblatt Ranking of all German-speaking economists under the age of 40, and named as one of Capitol Magazine's Top 40 Under 40. He also received the Emerald Literati Award in 2019 for Outstanding Author Contribution, the Health Economics Science Award from the German Association of Health Economists in 2018 and 2026, the 2017 Raymond Vernon Memorial Award for best paper in the Journal of Policy Analysis and Management, and the Small Area Variation Health Services Research Award from the ZI-Wissenschaftspreis Regionale Versorgungsforschung in 2015.

== Selected publications ==
- Raman, Shyam; Kriner, Douglas; Ziebarth, Nicolas; Simon, Kosali; Kreps, Sarah (October 2022). "COVID-19 booster uptake among US adults: Assessing the impact of vaccine attributes, incentives, and context in a choice-based experiment". Social Science & Medicine. 310 115277. doi:10.1016/j.socscimed.2022.115277. PMC 9376982. PMID 36001917.
- Marcus, Jan; Siedler, Thomas; Ziebarth, Nicolas R. (August 2022). "The Long-Run Effects of Sports Club Vouchers for Primary School Children". American Economic Journal: Economic Policy. 14 (3): 128–165. doi:10.1257/pol.20200431.
- Jelliffe, Emma; Pangburn, Paul; Pichler, Stefan; Ziebarth, Nicolas R. (20 July 2021). "Awareness and use of (emergency) sick leave: US employees' unaddressed sick leave needs in a global pandemic". Proceedings of the National Academy of Sciences. 118 (29) e2107670118. Bibcode:2021PNAS..11807670J. doi:10.1073/pnas.2107670118. PMC 8307616. PMID 34253617.
- Werbeck, Anna; Wübker, Ansgar; Ziebarth, Nicolas R. (August 2021). "Cream skimming by health care providers and inequality in health care access: Evidence from a randomized field experiment". Journal of Economic Behavior & Organization. 188: 1325–1350. doi:10.1016/j.jebo.2021.05.028. hdl:10419/220354.
- Pichler, Stefan; Wen, Katherine; Ziebarth, Nicolas R. (June 2021). "Positive Health Externalities of Mandating Paid Sick Leave". Journal of Policy Analysis and Management. 40 (3): 715–743. doi:10.1002/pam.22284. hdl:10419/223972.
- Arni, Patrick; Dragone, Davide; Goette, Lorenz; Ziebarth, Nicolas R. (March 2021). "Biased health perceptions and risky health behaviors—Theory and evidence". Journal of Health Economics. 76 102425. doi:10.1016/j.jhealeco.2021.102425. hdl:11585/797637. PMID 33578326.
- Pichler, Stefan; Wen, Katherine; Ziebarth, Nicolas R. (December 2020). "COVID-19 Emergency Sick Leave Has Helped Flatten The Curve In The United States: Study examines the impact of emergency sick leave on the spread of COVID-19". Health Affairs. 39 (12): 2197–2204. doi:10.1377/hlthaff.2020.00863. PMID 33058691.
- Pichler, Stefan; Ziebarth, Nicolas R. (2020). "Labor Market Effects of U.S. Sick Pay Mandates". Journal of Human Resources. 55 (2): 611–659. doi:10.3368/jhr.55.3.0117-8514R2. hdl:10419/141626.
- Jin, Lawrence; Ziebarth, Nicolas R. (February 2020). "Sleep, health, and human capital: Evidence from daylight saving time". Journal of Economic Behavior & Organization. 170: 174–192. doi:10.1016/j.jebo.2019.12.003.
- Atal, Juan Pablo; Fang, Hanming; Karlsson, Martin; Ziebarth, Nicolas R. (September 2019). "Exit, Voice, or Loyalty? An Investigation Into Mandated Portability of Front-Loaded Private Health Plans". Journal of Risk and Insurance. 86 (3): 697–727. doi:10.1111/jori.12233. hdl:10419/170855.
- Guardado, José R.; Ziebarth, Nicolas R. (February 2019). "Worker Investments in Safety, Workplace Accidents, and Compensating Wage Differentials". International Economic Review. 60 (1): 133–155. doi:10.1111/iere.12347.
- Dolan, Paul; Kavetsos, Georgios; Krekel, Christian; Mavridis, Dimitris; Metcalfe, Robert; Senik, Claudia; Szymanski, Stefan; Ziebarth, Nicolas R. (September 2019). "Quantifying the intangible impact of the Olympics using subjective well-being data". Journal of Public Economics. 177 104043. doi:10.1016/j.jpubeco.2019.07.002. hdl:10419/207373.
- Bünnings, Christian; Schmitz, Hendrik; Tauchmann, Harald; Ziebarth, Nicolas R. (June 2019). "The Role of Prices Relative to Supplemental Benefits and Service Quality in Health Plan Choice". Journal of Risk and Insurance. 86 (2): 415–449. doi:10.1111/jori.12219.
- Ziebarth, Nicolas R. (2018). "Social Insurance and Health". Health Econometrics. Contributions to Economic Analysis. Vol. 294. pp. 57–84. doi:10.1108/S0573-855520180000294003. ISBN 978-1-78714-542-9.
