= Ziebarth =

Ziebarth is a surname. Notable people with the surname include:

- Earl Ziebarth (born 1963), American politician
- E. W. Ziebarth (1910–2001), American radio broadcaster, professor, and academic administrator
- Nicolas Ziebarth (born 1982), German economist
