= Chartist =

Chartist may refer to:

- Chartist (occupation), a person who uses charts for technical analysis
- Chartist (magazine), a British democratic socialist periodical
- An adherent of Chartism, a 19th-century political and social reform movement in the UK
- Cartista, a member of a Portuguese political movement which arose in the 1820s (sometimes rendered as "Chartist" in English)
