= Gender pension gap =

The gender pension gap (also known as the sex pension gap) is the percentage difference in pension income between women and men. It is often calculated as the difference between the average man's pension and the average woman's pension, expressed as a percentage of the man's. The gap averages 26% across OECD countries.

== Background ==
Margaret Franklin, the president and CEO of the Chartered Financial Analysts Institute highlighted in 2021 that "The gender gap in retirement benefits does not grab headlines in the same manner as the pay gap, yet the issue remains no less urgent. And it needs fixing before even more women face poverty in retirement".

Analysis by Mercer CFA Institute Global Pension Index (MCGPI) highlighted that there was no single cause of the gap and all regions have significant gender differences in the level of retirement income.

In the UK there is no official government assessment of the size of the pension gap, nor policies specifically to address it. Estimates suggest that the gap increased to 37.9% in 2019–20, which is more than twice the size of the gender pay gap (15.5%). Women in retirement have 72% lower pension income than men The average pension pot of a woman in the UK at retirement (£10,000) is less than half that of a man (£21,000).

The gender pension gap is linked to the gender pay gap because it is partially caused by cumulative impact over time of women earning less than men, but it is particularly disadvantageous because women can take very little action to rectify it. Although it is illegal to pay women unfairly, there are many societal and structural conditions which cause the pay and pension gaps to remain and grow. The pension gap is particularly stark in areas of work which are traditionally female dominated. Research using data from Legal and General pension scheme members in the UK showed a typical gender pension gap of 56% at retirement. The gap impacts single women (and single mothers) more than those who are married .

European data (for 27 EU countries) indicates that the sex pension gap is most marked in Luxembourg, where women received 44% less pension, followed by Malta and the Netherlands (both 40%), Cyprus (39%), Austria (37%) and Germany (36%). Japan has a gap of 50% and Canada's gap is around 22%.

== Causes ==
A number of structural, cultural and behavioural factors contribute to the pensions gap, including:

- imbalance in the level of pension saving.
- disparities in pay rises ("the gender pay rise gap"). Research suggests that disparities in pay rises contribute to the gender pension gap.
- indirect gender discrimination built into the pension system. Millions of women miss out on workplace pensions because they do not qualify for auto enrollment into their scheme as they work in low-paid, or several part-time jobs
- women who are divorced may lose out on pension income as a result
- inconsistent use of shared parental leave. Recent research suggests that more men taking shared parental leave would reduce the pension gap.
- lack of access to affordable childcare. This restricts the work opportunities of women, and childcare costs paid by women leave less disposable income for saving.
- differences in risk aversion, financial risk tolerance and financial literacy.
- lower wages in female-dominated industries, such as hospitality, health and education.

=== Gender pension imbalance (United Kingdom) ===
The United Kingdom (UK) state pension was awarded at 65 years of age for men and 60 years for women until the 1995 Pensions Act which was to phase in a 'balance' to move women's pension age to equal that of men. The option to move men to 60 or to choose another age between the two was not taken up. The change was to be phased in over a ten-year period but the timeline was accelerated in the 2011 Pensions Act, which was said to have disadvantaged 2.6million women born between April 1951 and 1960, some having to wait a further 6 years before being able to claim their pension.

A protest group Women Against State Pension Inequality (WASPI) was created in 2015, and an online petition of 118,000 signatures asked Parliament for a formal debate on the matter, which took place in February 2016. Further protests took place and a crowd-funded legal action was taken contending the inequality of treatment of this cohort. Events marking the 2018 VOTE100 women's marches to mark the centenary of (some) women being given the franchise in the UK and International Women's Day; pension justice was raised among other inequalities and issues affecting only women, in a UK Parliamentary debate again. There were contrary views on the merits of the argument that women had been unfairly treated.

The issue of pension gaps, and the impact on the 1950s women featured in election campaigns in 2019. Another women's action group #backto60 took the view that full compensation for the women affected was appropriate, rather than a limited 'compensation' for the lack of government communications, and their crowd-funded court case led by Michael Mansfield, QC, was not finally supported by the Supreme Court in 2021, for the right of appeal. However the Parliamentary and Health Service Ombudsman found and reported in July 2021, based on six 'test cases' that there was 'maladministration' in the communications to women about their changes in state pension, by the relevant department of UK government (DWP). The Ombudsman updated the public information into its enquiry in February 2022, indicating that it was now awaiting evidence from the Department for Work and Pensions due by the end of March 2022, without which it cannot begin the 'stage two of..investigation and considering whether the failings.. identified led to an injustice for the complainants.' Sixty-four members of Parliament have backed a motion by Labour MP, Ian Byrne calling for full restitution (which supports #backto60 and 'We Paid In You Pay Out' groups' view), but other protest groups (WASPI) and the official All Party Parliamentary Group on State Pension Inequality for Women (APPG) propose a lesser compensation.

A wider review of the pension gap in the context of the lack of legislative implementation by successive UK governments, of the United Nations CEDAW Convention on the Elimination of all forms of Discrimination Against Women into UK law, held a people's tribunal in 2021, and took evidence which recommended that the UK should introduce a women's bill of rights.

== Solutions ==
Juan Yermo, Chief of Staff to the OECD Secretary-General, has said, "Policy makers need to account for and address the factors that can lead to gender inequalities, and should strive to design gender-neutral retirement savings arrangements.". In the UK, the Prospect Union have called for the government to tackle the gender pension gap through reform of automatic enrollment, additional state pension credit and affordable childcare and changes to the tax system. Researchers who analyse data about the pension gap over time highlight that current gaps in pension income reflect labour markets and pension contribution patterns from many years ago, people working now may have a different experience when they reach retirement. The gap increased during the years of the COVID-19 pandemic but the new experiments with alternative styles of working may offer employers opportunities to implement more flexible policies that will encourage more women to remain in the workforce.

== See also ==
- Life expectancy#Sex differences
- Retirement age
