= Henry Bartel =

Canadian academic

Dr. Harry Bartel
- Education: University of Western Ontario University of Toronto Indiana University Bloomington
- Alma mater: University of Toronto University of Western Ontario
- Occupation: Professor

Harry Bartel is a professor of administrative studies and economics at York University, Ontario, Canada. He is an expert in the areas of economic policy, economic policy analysis, and quantitative methods. He has over 200 publications, including journal articles and books, which have included work in applied micro and macroeconomic policies.

== Education ==
Bartel holds the following degrees, in business and economics, from the University of Western Ontario, University of Toronto and Indiana University Bloomington:

- PhD, Indiana University Bloomington (2020)
- M.A., Indiana University Bloomington
- M.B.A., University of Toronto
- Dip B.A., University of Toronto
- B.A., University of Western Ontario

== Career ==
Bartel is a professor of administrative studies and economics at York University. He has held an appointment at the Economic Council of Canada, has held numerous teaching positions, and has acted as a consultant at all levels of government and in the private sector.

Bartel has been on the faculty of three Canadian universities: Wilfrid Laurier University, Concordia University and York University. He has also taught internationally as a visiting professor at Indiana University, Roemerquelle Visiting professor at the Vienna University of Economics and Business, and visiting fellow at the Institute for Advanced Studies (Vienna).

Before beginning his teaching career, Bartel held a position as project director and senior analyst, Foreign Ownership and MNEs Group, Micro Economic Analysis Branch, Department of Industry, Trade and Commerce, Canada. Previous to that, he worked on pension plan/retirement income policies (Financial Markets Group) at the Economic Council of Canada and, before that, did work for the Unitec Stares Office of Education.

== Publications ==
=== Books ===
- Readings in Canadian Real Estate, with G. Arbuckle, 5th ed., Toronto: Captus University Publications. Forthcoming, Fall, 2010.
- Readings in Canadian Real Estate, with G. Arbuckle, 4th ed., Toronto: Captus University Publications. Spring 2005, Pp. x, 525.
- Readings in Canadian Real Estate, with G. Arbuckle, 3rd ed., Toronto: Captus University Publications, 1997. Pp. xi, 486.
- Australian Business Statistics, with A. Selvanathan, S. Selvanathan, G. Keller, and B. Warrack. South Melbourne, Victoria: Thomas Nelson Australia, 1994. Pp. xi, 855.
- Statistics for Management and Economics: Abbreviated Edition (paperback), with G. Keller and B. Warrack. Belmont, California: Duxbury Press, 1994. Pp. xvi, 849, + Appendix 52 pp.
- Statistics for Management and Economics, with G. Keller and B. Warrack, 3rd ed. Belmont, California: Duxbury Press/Wadsworth Publishing Co.1994. Pp. xxiii, 1016, + Appendix 56 pp.
- Readings in Canadian Real Estate, with G. Arbuckle, 2nd ed. Toronto: Captus University Publications, 1992. Pp xi, 447.
- Statistics for Management and Economics: A Systematic Approach, with G. Keller and B. Warrack, 2nd ed. Belmont, California: Wadsworth Publishing Co., 1990. Pp. xxiv, 1050.
- Readings in Canadian Real Estate, with G. Arbuckle. Toronto: University Press of Canada, 1988. Pp. vii, 380.
- Statistics for Management and Economics: A Systematic Approach, with G. Keller and B. Warrack. Belmont, California: Wadsworth Publishing Co., 1988. Pp. xix, 987. - To accompany the book, by the same authors, is a support package comprising Solutions Manual, Pp. 445, Instructor's Resource Book (with Test Bank) Pp. 156 + 102, and Wadsworth (Computerized) Testing Service.
- Study Guide (with Software) for Statistics for Management and Economics: A Systematic Approach, with G. Keller and B. Warrack. Belmont, California: Wadsworth Publishing Co., 1988. Pp. 334.
- Electronic Banking in Canada and the United States, with G. Arbuckle. Montreal: Gamma Institute Press, 1987. Pp. x, 198.

=== Book contributions ===
- "Outline of Real Estate Investment Trusts", with G. Arbuckle, in G. Arbuckle and H. Bartel (editors), Readings in Canadian Real Estate, 4th ed. Toronto: Captus University Publications, 2005. pp. 317–26.
- "Reverse Mortgages: Supplementary Retirement Income from Homeownership", with M. Daly and P. Wrage, reprinted in G. Arbuckle and H. Bartel (editors), Readings in Canadian Real Estate, 3rd ed. Toronto: Captus University Publications, 1997. Pp. xi, 486.
- "Economic Trends" as Chapter 2 in Canadian Employee Benefit Plans, 1992. Brookfield, Wisconsin: International Foundation of Employee Benefit Plans, 1993. pp. 7–16.
- "Effects of Free Trade" as Chapter 3 in Canadian Employee Benefit Plans, 1992. Brookfield, Wisconsin: International Foundation of Employee Benefit Plans, 1993. pp. 17–21.
- "Demographics and Housing in Canada, 1978-1996" with W.L. Marr and D.J. McCready, in G. Arbuckle and H. Bartel (editors), Readings in Canadian Real Estate, 2nd ed. Toronto: Captus University Publications, 1992. pp. 89–107. Also reprinted in G. Arbuckle and H. Bartel (editors), Readings in Canadian Real Estate, 3rd ed. Toronto: Captus University Publications, 1997. Pp. xi, 486. And again, in Readings in Canadian Real Estate, 4th ed., 2005.
- "Inflation, Housing Affordability, and the Graduated Payment Mortgage" with A. Marshall, reprinted in G. Arbuckle and H. Bartel (editors), Readings in Canadian Real Estate, 2nd ed. Toronto: Captus University Publications, 1992. pp. 334–46. Also reprinted in G. Arbuckle and H. Bartel (editors), Readings in Canadian Real Estate, 3rd ed. Toronto: Captus University Publications, 1997. Pp. xi, 486. And again, in Readings in Canadian Real Estate, 4th ed., 2005.
- "Statistics" a chapter in Introduction to Canadian Business, L. Allan et al. Scarborough, Ontario: McGraw-Hill Ryerson Limited, 1990.
- Case: "Spencer Mall" (adapted for the U.K.), in Cases in Business Administration, J.M. Parkinson, London, England, Fall, 1989. Pp. 2.
- "Outline of Real Estate Law" with G. Arbuckle, in G. Arbuckle and H. Bartel (editors), Readings in Canadian Real Estate. Toronto, University Press of Canada, 1988. pp. 179–96. Also reprinted in G. Arbuckle and H. Bartel (editors), Readings in Canadian Real Estate, 2nd ed. Toronto: Captus University Publications, 1992. pp. 347–54. Again reprinted in G. Arbuckle and H. Bartel (editors), Readings in Canadian Real Estate, 3rd ed. Toronto: Captus University Publications, 1997. Pp. xi, 486. And again, in Readings in Canadian Real Estate, 4th ed., 2005.
- "Mortgage Innovation in Canada" with A. Marshall, in G. Arbuckle and H. Bartel (editors), Readings in Canadian Real Estate. Toronto, University Press of Canada, 1988. pp. 275–90.
- "Reverse Annuity Mortgages as a Source of Retirement Income" with M.J. Daly, reprinted in Readings in Canadian Real Estate, G. Arbuckle and H. Bartel, (editors). Toronto: University Press of Canada, 1988. pp. 291–9. Also reprinted in G. Arbuckle and H. Bartel (editors), Readings in Canadian Real Estate, 2nd ed. Toronto: Captus University Publications, 1992. Pp. xi, 447. And again, in Readings in Canadian Real Estate, 4th ed., 2005.
- "Elements of Real Estate Law" a chapter in Real Estate Analysis and Appraisal, with D. Achour and S. Hamilton. Laval, Quebec: Fischer Presses, 1987. Pp. 20.
- "Performance Ratings and Investment Funds: A Case Study of Canadian Closed-End Mutual Funds", reprinted in A. Marshall, Financial Analysis: Putting Theory into Practice. Toronto: Captus Press, 1987 (again in 1988 and 1989 editions). pp. 98–116.
- Minicase: "Consumer Report on Stereo TVs", in J.R. McCutcheon and J.M. Parkinson, Introduction to Administrative Studies, 2nd ed. Toronto: Captus Press, 1987. pp. 385–6.
- Case: Spencer Mall. The University of Western Ontario and York University, Copyright(c), April, 1987. Pp. 4.
- One in Three: Pensions for Canadians to 2030. Contributing author to Economic Council of Canada Consensus Report. November, 1979. Pp. x, 145.

=== Journal articles ===
- "On Evaluating the Relative Efficacy of the Marketing Function in the Construction Complex of the Ukraine", with E. Skliarenko. International Advances in Economic Research. February, 2006, XII(1).
- "How Ethnicity Influences Service Expectations - A Canadian Perspective", with K. Snow and T. Cullen, Managing Service Quality Journal; Volume 6; Number 6, 1996; pp. 33 – 7. [Recipient of the 1997 Award for Excellence for the most outstanding refereed article of the year.]
- "Ethnic Influences on Service Expectations: Results of a Pilot Study", with K. Snow and T. Cullen. International Advances in Economic Research. Volume 2, Number 3 (August), 1996, Pp. 324 – 33.
- "The Graduated Payment Mortgage and Upgrade Housing Affordability", with A. Marshall. The Land Economist. March, 1989, 19(2), pp. 1–3.
- "Inflation, Housing Affordability and the Graduated Payment Mortgage", with A. Marshall. Canadian Journal of Real Estate. October, 1988, pp. 18–25.
- "Reverse Annuity Mortgages as a Source of Retirement Income", with M. J. Daly. Canadian Public Policy. Autumn, 1980, VI(4), pp. 584–90.
- "Reverse Mortgages: Supplementary Retirement Income from Homeownership", with M. Daly and P. Wrage, Journal of Risk and Insurance. September, 1980, XLVII(3), pp. 477–90.
- "Retirement Income Policies: The Issues". The Business Quarterly. Winter, 1980, 45(4), pp. 44–7.
- "An Econometric Forecast for 1975", with A.E. Field and P. Wrage. Indiana Business Review. January/February, 1975, pp. 15–6.
- "Mr. Nixon's New Economic Policy: The How and Why of the U.S. Economic Measures and the Impact on Canada", with P. Anderssen. Cost and Management. November/December, 1971, pp. 24–7.
- "Mathematics: The Black Sheep of Business", with P. Wrage. The Certified General Accountants Journal. February/March, 1970, pp. 33–5.

=== Conference proceedings ===
- "Housing Affordability and the Graduated Payment Mortgage", with A. Marshall. Published in the Papers and Proceedings of the Real Estate and Urban Management Group of the Administrative Sciences Association of Canada, Halifax, Nova Scotia. Fall,1988. Pp. 9.
- "Some Fiscal Experiments with Alternative Housing Subsidies", with D.J. McCready. Published in the Papers and Proceedings of the Real Estate and Urban Management Group of the Administrative Sciences Association of Canada, Whistler, British Columbia. Fall, 1986. Pp. 11.
- "Reverse Annuity Mortgages and the Yield to Maturity for Financial Institutions", with William F. Rentz. Published in the Papers and Proceedings of the Real Estate and Urban Management Group of the Administrative Sciences Association of Canada, Guelph, Ontario. Fall, 1984. Pp. 10.
- "Discussion Paper: Alternative Theories of the Phillips Curve and Their Implications for Macroeconomic Policy". Published in the Illinois Economic Association: Papers and Proceedings. Chicago. Spring, 1976. Pp. 56.

=== Conference papers ===
- "Assessing Marketing Structures in Transition Economies" with E. Skliarenko. Presented at the International Atlantic Economic Conference, 59th Annual Meetings. London, England. March, 2005.
- "Transition Economies and the Efficacy of Imported Business Strategies" with E. Skliarenko. Presented at the International Atlantic Economic Conference, 58th Annual Meetings. Chicago, U.S.A. October, 2004.
- "Transition Economies and the Relative Efficacy of Imported Foreign Marketing Strategies" with E. Skliarenko. Presented at the Canadian Economics Association, 38th Annual Meetings. Toronto, Canada. June, 2004, Pp. 20.
- "Compliance Standards for Non-Profit Organizations" with J. Macintosh. Presented at the International Atlantic Economic Society, 50th International Conference, Charleston, South Carolina, October, 2000, Pp. 43.
- "Accounting for Nonprofit Organizations" with J. Macintosh and K. Snow. Presented at the International Atlantic Economic Society, 48th International Conference, Montreal, Canada, October, 1999, Pp. 20.
- "Customer Expectations in the Financial Sector: A Multivariate Approach" with K. Snow and T. Cullen. Presented at the International Atlantic Economic Society, 46th International Conference, Boston, Massachusetts, October, 1998, Pp. 11.
- "The Use of Student Surrogates in Market Research: Some New Evidence" with K. Snow and T. Cullen. Presented at the International Atlantic Economic Society, 44th International Conference, Philadelphia, Pennsylvania, October, 1997, Pp. 19.
- "Ethnic Influences on Service Expectations: A Preliminary Study", with K. Snow and T. Cullen. Presented at the International Atlantic Economic Society, 40th International Conference, Williamsburg, Virginia, October, 1995. Pp. 17. (Abstract published in International Advances in Economic Research, Volume 2, Number 1, February, 1996.)
- "Electronic Banking and Marketing". Invited Paper at the Colloquium for Advertising and Sales, Wirtschafts University of Vienna, Vienna, Austria. June, 1990. Pp. 33.
- "Examining the Forecasting Accuracy of Survey Data". Invited paper presented at the Institute for Advanced Studies, Vienna, Austria. November, 1989. Pp. 31.
- "Combining Cross Sections Over Time with an Error-Component Model". Invited paper presented at the Institute for Advanced Studies, Vienna, Austria. November, 1989. Pp. 25.
- "A Statistical Examination of Capacity Utilization". Invited paper presented at the Institute for Advanced Studies, Vienna, Austria. November, 1989. Pp. 28.
- "Housing Affordability and the Graduated Payment Mortgage", with A. Marshall. Invited paper presented at the Administrative Sciences Association of Canada, 1988 Conference, Halifax, Nova Scotia. June, 1988.
- "Some Fiscal Experiments with Alternative Housing Subsidies", with D.J. McCready. Invited paper presented at the Administrative Sciences Association of Canada, 1986 Conference, Whistler, British Columbia. June, 1986.
- "Reverse Annuity Mortgages and the Yield to Maturity for Financial Institutions", with William F. Rentz. Presented at the Administrative Sciences Association of Canada, 1984 Conference, Guelph, Ontario. May, 1984.
- "Inflation Indexing for the Elderly: The Problem of an Appropriate Price Index", with P. Wrage. Invited Session on 'Pension Plans in Canada'. Invited paper presented at the Eastern Economic Association, 6th Annual Convention, Montreal, Quebec. May, 1980. Pp. 12
- "Using the Edgeworth Approximation of the Prior Probability Density Function", with G. Keller and B. D. Warrack. Presented at the Canadian Economics Association, 13th Annual Meeting, Saskatoon, Saskatchewan. May, 1979. Pp. 10.
- "The Effect of Public Pensions on Saving and Investment: The Canadian Experience", with P. Wrage. Invited paper presented at the Eastern Economic Association, 5th Annual Convention, Boston, Massachusetts. May, 1979. Pp. 15.
- "The Future Development of the Pension System in Canada". Invited paper presented to the Canadian Teachers' Federation Conference on Pensions, Ottawa. January, 1979. Pp. 10.
- "Deriving the Demand for Higher Education: A Human Capital Approach". Presented at the Southern Economic Association, 48th Annual Conference, Washington, D.C. November, 1978. Pp. 33.
- "Pension Plans in Canada: The Economic Impact of Canada's Retirement Income System". Presented at the Canadian Co-Operative Credit Union Conference, Toronto, Canada. October, 1978. Pp. 10.
- "An Empirical Analysis of the Short-Run Demand for Higher Education". Presented at the Western Economic Association, 52nd Annual Conference, Anaheim, California. June, 1977. Pp. 23.
- "The Ambiguity of Professor Friedman's Methodology of Positive Economics". Presented at the 8th Annual Management Research Forum, Toronto. May 1977. Pp. 15.
- "Economic Controls, Social Justice, and the State: The Canadian Dilemma", with P. Wrage. Presented at the Atlantic Economic Society, 4th Annual Meetings, Washington, D.C. October, 1976. Pp. 33. (Abstract published in the Atlantic Economic Journal, Vol. V, No. 1, Winter, 1977.)
- "Discussion Paper: Alternative Theories of the Phillips Curve and Their Implications for Macroeconomic Policy". Presented at the Illinois Economic Association, Annual Meeting, Chicago. Spring, 1976.
- "The Edgeworth Series as a Prior Density Function in the Two-Action Problem", with G. Keller and B.D. Warrack. Presented at the Operations Research Society of America and the Institute of Management Science, Joint National Annual Meetings, Miami, Florida. November, 1976. Pp. 10. (Abstract published in the ORSA/TIMS Bulletin, 1976, No.2.)
- "The Two-Action Problem with a General Prior Density Function", with G. Keller and B.D. Warrack. Presented at the 7th Annual Management Research Forum, Windsor, Ontario. May, 1976. Pp. 10.
- "An Economic Interpretation of Direct Costing". Public Seminar Paper presented at the Management Conference of the Certified General Accountants Society, Toronto. February, 1970. Pp. 10.
