= Elizabeth Azcona Bocock =

Honduran politician

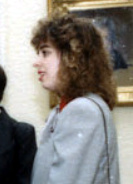
Azcona in 1987

Elizabeth "Lizi" Azcona Bocock, (born October 5, 1969 in La Ceiba, Honduras), is the Minister of Industry and Commerce in the cabinet of Honduras president Manuel Zelaya.

== Background ==
The eldest daughter of former president José Azcona (QDDG) and Miriam Bocock de Azcona, Elizabeth Azcona received her primary and secondary education at the Elvel School of Tegucigalpa before going on to the University of Notre Dame in the United States to earn a Master's degree in Business Administration, with a minor in Finance.

From 1990 to 2001, Azcona worked in the Bank Atlantida in the area of generation of businesses and evaluation of credits. From 2001 to 2003, she was a Risk Analyst for Citigroup. She took a position as professor at the Universidad José Cecilio del Valle, conducting classes on finances and formulation of projects, while at the same time working with the Inter-American Corporation of Investments (CII), an arm of the Inter-American Development Bank (I.A.D.B.). In January 2006, Azcona left her position in the CII to become Minister of Industry and Commerce.

Azcona is married to industrialist Jorge Valladares, with whom she has two children.
