= Global assets under management =

Financial concept

In finance, global assets under management consists of assets held by institutional investors and individual investors around the world. For example, these institutional investors include asset management firms, pension funds, endowments, foundations, sovereign wealth funds, hedge funds, and private equity funds. In contrast, individual investors include ultra high-net-worth individuals (UHNWI), high-net-worth individuals (HNWI), the mass affluent, and other retail investors.

== Assets by classification ==
Rank	Fund type	US$ billion	Figures as of
—	Private wealth	$32,800 ^{1}	2008
1	Pension funds	$62,000	2021
2	Banks	$50,600	2013
3	Insurance companies	$35,100	2020
4	Mutual funds	$23,800	2011
5	Real estate	$10,000	2006
6	Foreign exchange reserves	$7,341	February 2008
7	Sovereign wealth funds	$3,980	2011
8	Hedge funds	$2,845	2014
9	Private equity funds	$1,600	2009
10	REITs	$764	2007
11	Family Offices	$140 - $420	2011

- ^1Around one third of private wealth is incorporated in conventional investment management (Pension funds, Mutual funds and Insurance assets).
- ^2 Many surveys systematically overestimate the global wealth pool. This is because they fail to separate out assets that are inaccessible for wealth management services (e.g. pension assets, real estate, dedicated liquidity, etc.)

== Assets by region ==
Assets by region, 2020
Region	Value by region (in US$ billions)
North America	40,000
Europe	20,000
Middle East	6,000
Japan and Australia	5,200
Asia (excluding Japan and Australia)	5,200
Latin America	2,000

== Assets by company ==
=== Key ===
- AM — Asset management firm
- FOREX — Foreign exchange reserves
- HF — Hedge fund
- MF — (Exchange Traded) Mutual fund
- PEN — Pension fund
- PE — Private equity firm
- SWF — Sovereign wealth fund
- UHNWI — (Billionaire) Ultra high-net-worth individual

=== Companies ===
Investor Name	Type	Total assets (US$ billion)
BlackRock	AM	15,100
Charles Schwab Corporation	AM	11,900
The Vanguard Group	AM	12,000
People's Bank of China	FOREX	7,130
Fidelity Investments	AM	3,600
Allianz Asset Management (PIMCO + Allianz Global Investors)	AM	3,400
State Street Global Advisors	AM	3,300
Capital Group	AM	2,300
JPMorgan Chase	AM	2,300
BNY Mellon Investment Management	AM	2,300
Goldman Sachs	AM	2,300
Amundi	AM	2,000
Government Pension Investment Fund (Japan)	PEN	1,370
Bank of Japan	FOREX	1,264
Government Pension Fund - Global (Norway)	SWF	893
Government Pension Fund of Norway (Norway)	PEN	856
Civil Service Retirement and Disability Fund (United States)	PEN	832
Abu Dhabi Investment Authority (Abu Dhabi)	SWF	773
SAMA Foreign Holdings (Saudi Arabia)	SWF	757
Saudi Arabian Monetary Authority	FOREX	745
UBS Asset Management	AM	680
China Investment Corporation (China)	SWF	653
SAFE Investment Company (China)	SWF	567
Swiss National Bank	FOREX	531
Central Bank of the Russian Federation	FOREX	429
Stichting Pensioenfonds ABP (Netherlands)	PEN	427
National Pension Service (South Korea)	PEN	400
Canada Pension Plan Investment Board	AM	278
Barclays Inverse US Treasury Composite ETN (Blackrock)	MF	211
SPDR S&P 500 (State Street Global Advisors)	MF	200
Bridgewater Associates	HF	78
Bill Gates (Microsoft)	UHNWI	76
Carlos Slim (Grupo Carso/Telemex)	UHNWI	72
Core S&P 500 ETF (Blackrock)	MF	70
Man Group	HF	65
Amancio Ortega (Inditex Group)	UHNWI	64
Warren Buffett (Berkshire Hathaway)	UHNWI	58
iShare MSCI EAFE ETF (Blackrock)	MF	54
Total Stock Market ETF (the Vanguard Group)	MF	50
Larry Ellison (Oracle Corporation)	UHNWI	48
JP Morgan Asset Management	HF	47
Brevan Howard Asset Management	HF	37
TPG Capital	PE	36
the Carlyle Group	PE	33
the Blackstone Group	PE	30
Och-Ziff Capital Management Group	HF	29
Kohlberg Kravis Roberts (KKR)	PE	28
Warburg Pincus	PE	26

== Discretionary vs non-discretionary assets ==
Global assets under management include both discretionary and non-discretionary assets. However, there are important differences between these two types of assets. Industry standards and guidance to distinguish the two types has been established by Global Investment Performance Standards (GIPS). According to GIPS, discretion refers to the extent to which an organization, for example an asset manager, is permitted to manage the assets and implement its intended investment strategy on behalf of the asset owner. More specifically, discretion refers to the extent to which assets are permitted to be managed, and intended investment strategies are permitted to be implemented, through the decisions and actions of fund managers and general partners (GPs) at the asset manager.

The asset owner ultimately owns the assets. For example, asset owners include institutional limited partners (LPs), such as endowments, foundations, pension funds, and sovereign wealth funds. If restrictions and limitations imposed by the asset owner significantly hinder the organization from fully implementing the intended investment strategy, the assets may be considered non-discretionary. There are degrees of discretion and not all restrictions and limitations will necessarily result in assets being considered non-discretionary. For example, if an asset owner requires that the organization avoid any tobacco-related investments, the organization would first consider if this restriction hinders the implementation of the intended strategy. If it does, the organization would likely classify these assets as non-discretionary.

== Global assets under advisement ==
A concept related to global assets under management in the investment industry is global assets under advisement (AUA). This measures the total market value of the assets that are advised by a financial institution, which is often an investment consultant or other intermediary. In general, the advisory firm does not have discretion to manage the assets. Rather, in a non-discretionary manner, it provides advice and makes recommendations as to how those assets may be managed.

== See also ==
- Assets under management

== Sources ==
- IMF - Global asset allocation
- TheCityUK - Fund management
- Morgan Stanley - World's $165 trillion worth of traded securities
- "The Center for Investors' Confidence". Archived from the original on 2008-10-26.
