= CFA Institute Research Challenge =

Student equity research competition

The CFA Institute Research Challenge is an annual global competition in equity research hosted by the CFA Institute started in 2007. The competition provides university students with hands-on training and mentoring in financial analysis. Students assume the role of a research analyst and are scored based on their ability to value a stock, write an initiation-of-coverage report, and present their recommendations. The competition is split by 3 geographical regions, Asia Pacific, EMEA, and the Americas. Both undergraduate and graduate students are eligible to participate. Teams begin in local competitions, from which winners advance to regional competitions. A final competition held in April identifies the winning team at the global level.

For 2019, more than 6,100 students from over 1,150 universities from 95 countries participated in the competition.

== Team Compositions ==
Teams are sponsored by a university located within the area of the local competition in which the team wishes to compete. Each university may field up to two teams of three to five members.

== Results ==
Year	Global Final Champion (gold)	Americas Regional Final Champion (silver)	Asia Pacific Regional Final Champion (silver)	EMEA Regional Final Champion (silver)
2007	(United States) Babson College	(United States) Babson College (United States) Rice University (United States) Seton Hall University	Chinese University of Hong Kong	N/A
2008	Hong Kong Baptist University	(United States) University of Houston (Canada) University of New Brunswick	Hong Kong Baptist University	(Spain) Charles III University of Madrid
2009	(Singapore) Nanyang Technological University	(United States) Yale University (Brazil) Fundação Getulio Vargas	(Singapore) Nanyang Technological University	(Republic of Ireland) University College Cork
2010	University of the Philippines Diliman	(United States) Brigham Young University (United States) Fordham University	University of the Philippines Diliman	(South Africa) University of Cape Town
2011	(Italy) Polytechnic University of Milan	(United States) University of Southern California (United States) Rutgers University	(Thailand) Thammasat University	(Italy) Polytechnic University of Milan
2012	(Thailand) Thammasat University	(United States) Illinois Institute of Technology (United States) Rutgers University	(Thailand) Thammasat University	(Sweden) Stockholm School of Economics
2013	(Poland) Wroclaw University of Economics	(United States) University of Nevada, Las Vegas (United States) Fordham University	(India) Narsee Monjee Institute of Management Studies	(Poland) Wroclaw University of Economics
2014	University of the Philippines Diliman	(United States) University of Missouri	University of the Philippines Diliman	(Italy) Polytechnic University of Milan
2015	(United States) Canisius College	(United States) Canisius College (United States) University of Florida	(Philippines) Ateneo de Manila University	(Ukraine) Kyiv National Economic University
2016	(Canada) University of Waterloo	(Canada) University of Waterloo (United States) University of Georgia	(Philippines) Ateneo de Manila University	(Italy) Polytechnic University of Milan
2017	(Dominican Republic) Barna Business School	(Dominican Republic) Barna Business School (United States) Seton Hall University	Singapore Management University	(Norway) BI Norwegian Business School
2018	(Switzerland) University of Lausanne	(United States) Jacksonville University (United States) University of Minnesota Duluth	(Malaysia) Sunway University	(Norway) BI Norwegian Business School (Switzerland) University of Lausanne
2019	(Philippines) Ateneo de Manila University	(United States) Canisius College (Mexico) Instituto Tecnológico Autónomo de México	(Philippines) Ateneo de Manila University	(Russia) Moscow State University (Switzerland) University of Lausanne
2020	(Australia) University of Sydney	(United States) Seton Hall University (Brazil) Universidade de São Paulo	(Australia) University of Sydney	(Norway) BI Norwegian Business School (Switzerland) University of Lausanne
2021	(Norway) BI Norwegian Business School	(Canada) University of Waterloo (United States) Appalachian State University	(Australia) University of Sydney	(Norway) BI Norwegian Business School (Germany) WHU – Otto Beisheim School of Management
2022	(United States) Northern Illinois University	(Canada) University of British Columbia (United States) Northern Illinois University	(Australia) University of Sydney	(Spain) IE Business School (Italy) Polytechnic University of Milan
2023	(Australia) University of Sydney	(United States) California Polytechnic State University (United States) California State University, Fullerton	University of Indonesia (Australia) University of Sydney	(Italy) Polytechnic University of Milan (Switzerland) University of Neuchatel
2024	(Canada) University of Waterloo	(Canada) University of Waterloo (Brazil) Fundação Getulio Vargas	(Australia) Australian National University; University of the Philippines Diliman	Qatar University (Germany) WHU – Otto Beisheim School of Management
2025	(Poland) Kozminski University	(Canada) University of Waterloo (United States) Appalachian State University	(Australia) University of Sydney; University of Hong Kong	(Poland) Kozminski University (Switzerland) University of Neuchâtel
2026	(Canada) University of Waterloo	(Canada) University of Waterloo (United States) California State University, Fullerton	(China) University of Peking (China) Shanghai Jiao Tong University	(Jordan) Princess Sumaya University for Technology (Slovenia) University of Ljubljana

- Americas Region Final Champions include New York Regional Final Champions (defunct category after 2013).

== Ranking ==
Winning Teams
Rank	Country	(gold) Global Champion	(silver) Regional Champion
1	United States	3	28
2	Canada; Philippines	3	6
3	Australia	2	6
3	Poland	2	2
4	Italy; Switzerland	1	5
5	Norway	1	4
6	Hong Kong	1	3
6	Singapore; Thailand	1	2
7	Dominican Republic	1	1
8	Brazil	0	3
9	China; Germany; Spain	0	2
10	India; Indonesia; Ireland; Malaysia; Mexico; Qatar; Russia; Slovenia; South Africa; Sweden; Ukraine	0	1

== See also ==
- CFA Institute
- Chartered Financial Analyst
- Certificate in Investment Performance Measurement
