= Airmic =

Airmic (the Association of Insurance and Risk Managers in Industry and Commerce; formerly the Association of Insurance and Risk Managers) is a UK-based association and representative body. Established in 1963, it exists to promote the interests of corporate insurance buyers and those involved in enterprise risk management, and to encourage best practice. It is run as a not-for-profit company limited by guarantee, governed by a board of directors elected from members with support from a full-time London-based secretariat.

== Purpose ==
Airmic’s ten-year strategy (agreed, 2011) highlights five key priorities:

- to support members in their professional development and execution of their roles;
- to ensure that the value of risk management and insurance is understood at board level;
- to promote and influence the further development of recognised risk management qualifications;
- to drive research and market efficiency in business insurance; and
- to provide thought leadership in the area of risk management.

== Membership ==
Membership can either be on an individual or corporate basis; there are around 1300 members and nearly 400 different companies represented. They come mainly from multi-national businesses, including around three quarters of FTSE 100 companies. Medium-sized and smaller enterprises, charities and public-sector organisations such as universities and local authorities are also represented. It is supported by a number of companies that supply services to the association’s members and, although not eligible to join, have Partner or Associate Partner status.

== Activities ==
Airmic’s member-facing activities centre to a large degree on the provision of information and networking opportunities, including an annual conference, lectures, seminars, monthly news email and a series of around 50 Airmic Academy workshops a year. It also represents the association’s views to government, regulators, other market bodies and the EU. In recent years it has produced a number of initiatives to assist insurance buyers, especially in relation to claims payment, contract clauses and the placement of global programmes.

== Publications ==
Airmic produces internally a wide range of technical publications designed to support members in their work. In addition, it has commissioned and published pieces of research aimed at a wider audience. These include:

- A cost-benefit analysis of Enterprise Risk Management (conducted by Det Norske Veritas)
- Roads to Ruin – why companies sometimes fail (carried out by Cass Business School)
- Roads to Resilience: Building dynamic approaches to risk to achieve future success. Published by Airmic (2014). ISBN 978-0-9928275-0-2

== See also ==
- American Risk and Insurance Association
- Global Association of Risk Professionals
- Institute of Risk Management
- Risk and Insurance Management Society
