= Margaret Franklin =

American financial analyst and economist

Margaret Franklin is an American economist who is CEO and President of the CFA Institute. Franklin is the first woman to hold this role.

She assumed this role in September 2019.

She has spoken about the factors which deter women from joining the financial services and investment industry, as well as the impacts of the gender pensions gap on the retirement of women. She is also regularly invited to speak at industry events on the impact of environmental, social, and governance (ESG) factors on the investment process and profession.

== Education and career ==
She holds a degree in economics from McMaster University in Ontario. Franklin is also a CFA charterholder.

Franklin has previously worked at a number of other financial institutions including Marret Private Wealth, State Street Global Advisors and Barclays Global Investors. Prior to joining Marret, Margaret was a partner with KJ Harrison & Partners.

She was chair of the CFA board of governors in 2011 and on the board of the CFA Society Toronto. She was previously President of BNY Mellon Wealth Management in Canada and head of International Wealth Management in North America. She joined BNY Mellon in 2016.

== Awards ==
Franklin was awarded the CFA Institute's Alfred C. “Pete” Morley Distinguished Service Award in 2014 The award is given to individuals who have made a significant contribution to the leadership of the CFA Institute

In 2020, she was awarded a Top Voice in for the Finance & Economy category on LinkedIn for her content about the investment profession in recognition of the quality and engagement of her postings.
