= Professional Risk Managers' International Association =

Organization for risk management professionals

- Abbreviation: PRMIA
- Formation: 2002
- Type: not-for-profit organization
- Headquarters: Northfield, Minnesota
- Coordinates: 44°26′24.55″N 93°11′12″W
- Region served: Worldwide
- Members: 50,000
- Official language: English
- Chair: David Coleman
- CEO: Justin C McCarthy
- Website: www.prmia.org

The Professional Risk Managers' International Association (PRMIA) is a non-profit, member-driven professional organization that focuses on the development and education of the risk management profession. Its membership provides a network of risk professionals working to set standards for the global risk profession. PRMIA offers the Professional Risk Manager designation and several other certificate programs for professional certification purposes.

== Professional Risk Manager ==
The Professional Risk Manager (PRM) designation is a professional certification offered by PRMIA. The designation was first awarded in 2004. The PRM is an "independent validation" of skills within the financial risk management profession, and professional ethics. The PRM and the FRM offered by the Global Association of Risk Professionals are often compared as being the two definitive risk management designations in the industry.

PRM Candidates are required to pass two exams in sequence; both 4 hours in duration:

1. (a) Finance theory, financial instruments, and financial markets; (b) Mathematical foundations of risk measurement (calculus, matrix- and linear algebra, probability, statistics, and numerical methods)
2. (a) Risk management practices (risk management frameworks [capital allocation, regulatory capital, economic capital, capital adequacy], operational risk, credit risk, counterparty credit risk, market risk, liquidity risk, FTP, ALM); (b) Case studies; (c) PRMIA standards of best practice, conduct and ethics

The exams are computer-based and the questions are all multiple choice; the passing grade is 60%. The exams must be completed over a period of up to two years; they are offered during four specific testing windows per year. Historic individual exam pass rates, under the pre-2019 structure, were 54% for Exam II (mathematics), 59% for Exams I and III (finance, and risk management), and 78% for Exam IV (standards and case studies); with an overall completion-rate of just over 65%. The PRM program recognizes other professional designations and gives partial credit to "cross-over" candidates, as well as to graduates of select university programs.

Minimum experience requirements are: four years without a bachelor's degree; two years for those with bachelor's degrees; no requirements for holders of a relevant graduate degree (i.e. MBA, MSF, MQF etc.) or of an accepted professional designation (CFA, CAIA, CQF, etc.). To maintain the designation, holders are required to complete 20 "Continuing Risk Learning" credits each year, to renew their "Sustaining Membership", and to uphold the professional and ethical standards as defined by the PRMIA Standards of Best Practice, Conduct and Ethics.

== Other programs ==
Since 2022, PRMIA has offered the ORM Designation, focusing on the "skills and capabilities" of the Operational Risk Manager role. The designation requires 2 exams, 8 hours in total, 1 year of direct operational risk experience, and a combination of 4 year's other work experience or completed degrees. As for the PRM, Designates must submit 20 CRL credits each year.

PRMIA offers various stand-alone certificate programs designed to give a focused and foundational understanding of various areas of risk management. As for the PRM, the passing score for these is 60%. The computerized tests are offered on all business days. To maintain certification one is required to uphold PRMIA’s professional and ethical standards.

- The "Associate PRM" covers the core risk management concepts in a less mathematical fashion than the PRM, "allowing non-specialists to interpret risk management information and reports". A single 3 hour exam is required; the recommended text is The Essentials of Risk Management (ISBN 0071429662).
- The "Operational Risk Manager Certificate" prepares managers to "implement risk assessment initiatives, produce risk management information and understand basic modeling techniques"; this is an entry-level certificate, as distinct from the Designation above. The exam is 2 hours duration. Preparation is the practitioner-authored Operational Risk Manager Certificate Handbook. ORM Online Training is also available.
- The "Credit and Counterparty Risk Manager" Certificate focuses on a practical understanding of credit risk analysis frameworks within financial institutions. The program is designed to be relevant to credit risk staff, as well as to financial controllers, and compliance and legal officers. The exam is 2 hours duration. Preparation is the Credit and Counterparty Risk Manager Handbook.
- The "Market, Liquidity and Asset Liability Management Risk Manager Certificate" covers the areas of market risk, liquidity risk, and asset liability management, and similarly focuses on application in financial institutions. The exam is 2 hours duration. Preparation is the Market, Liquidity and Asset Liability Management Risk Manager Handbook.

== See also ==
Institutions

- American Risk and Insurance Association
- Association of Insurance and Risk Managers in Industry and Commerce
- Global Association of Risk Professionals
- Institute of Risk Management
- Risk and Insurance Management Society

Certifications

- Certified Risk Analyst (CRA)
- Certified Risk Management Professional (RIMS-CRMP)
- Certified Risk Professional (MIRM designation; ERM focused)
- Chartered Enterprise Risk Actuary (CERA; Institute and Faculty of Actuaries credential)
- Chartered Enterprise Risk Analyst (CERA; Society of Actuaries credential)
- Financial Risk Manager (FRM)
