= High-net-worth individual =

People with a net worth of at least US$1 million

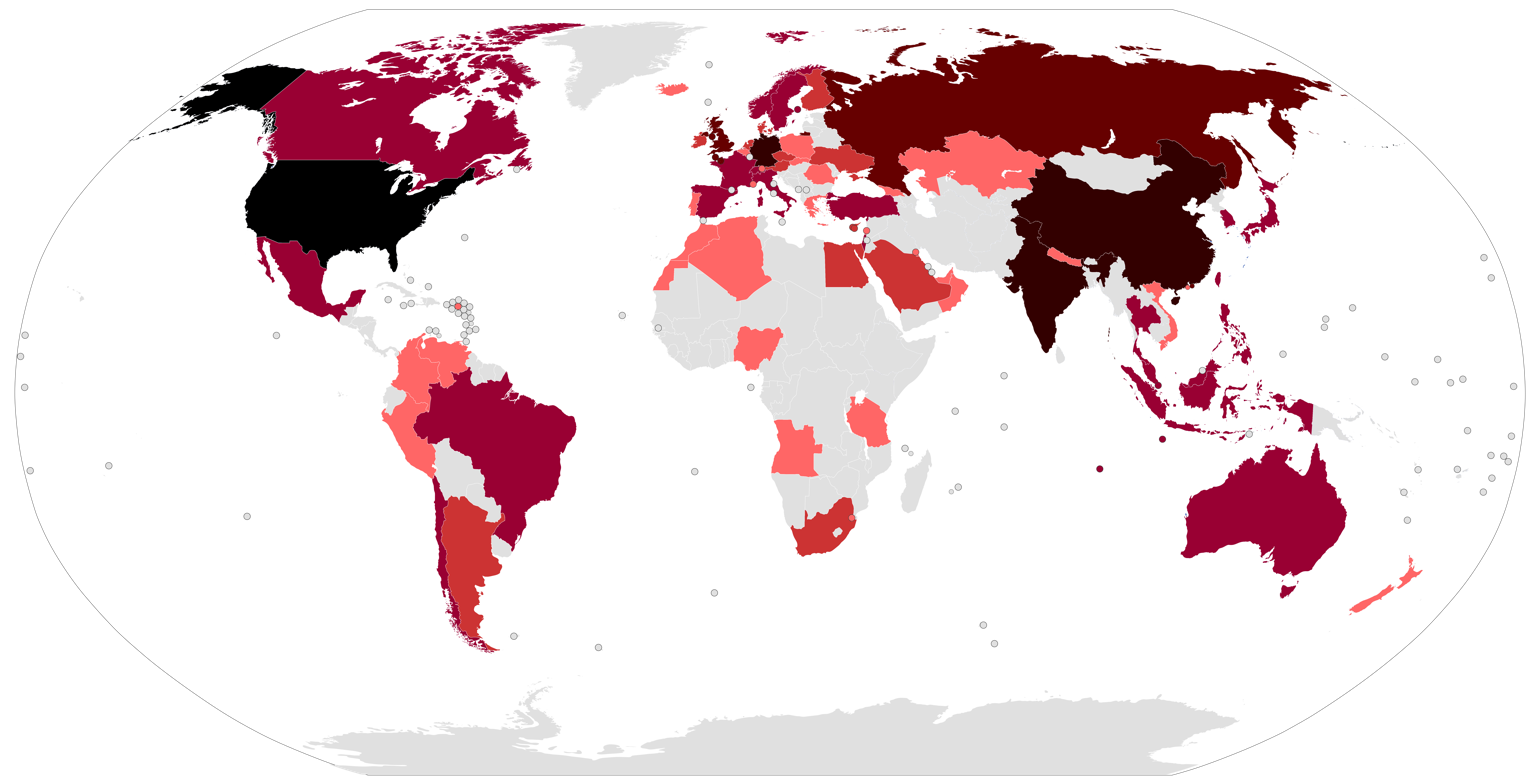
The United States, China, and India lead the worldwide distribution of high-net-worth individuals, as of 2017.

In the financial services industry, a high-net-worth individual (HNWI) is a person who maintains liquid assets at or above a certain threshold. Typically the criterion is that the person's financial assets (excluding their primary residence) are valued over US$1 million. A secondary level, a very-high-net-worth individual (VHNWI), is someone with at least US$5 million in investable assets. The terminal level, an ultra-high-net-worth individual (UHNWI), holds at least US$30 million in investable assets (adjusted for inflation). Individuals with a net worth of over US$1 billion are considered to occupy a special bracket of the UHNWI. These thresholds are broadly used in studies of wealth inequality, government regulation, investment suitability requirements, marketing, financing standards, and general corporate strategy.

UHNWIs constitute only 0.003% of the world's population, yet hold 13% of the world's total wealth. In 2017, 226,450 people were designated as UHNWI, with their combined total wealth increasing to $27 trillion.

== United States: SEC regulations ==
The U.S. Securities and Exchange Commission requires all SEC-registered investment advisers to periodically file a report known as Form ADV. Form ADV requires each investment adviser to state how many of their clients are "high-net-worth individuals", among other details; its Glossary of Terms explains that a "high-net-worth individual" is a person who is either a "qualified client" under rule 205-3 of the Advisers Act (currently a person with at least $1,100,000 managed by the reporting investment adviser, or whose net worth the investment adviser reasonably believes exceeds $2,200,000 without counting their primary residence) or who is a "qualified purchaser" as defined in section 2(a)(51)(A) of the Investment Company Act of 1940. The Dodd-Frank Wall Street Reform Act mandates that the definition of a qualified client be reviewed every five years and adjusted for inflation. For SEC purposes, a person's net worth may include assets held jointly with their spouse. Unlike the definitions used in the financial and banking trade, the SEC's definition of HNWI includes the value of a person's verifiable non-financial assets, such as a primary residence or art collection.

== Annual World Wealth Report ==
The World Wealth Report was co-published by Merrill Lynch and Capgemini who worked together since 1993, investigating the "needs of high-net-worth individuals" to "successfully serve this market segment". Their first annual World Wealth Report was published in 1996. The World Wealth Report defines HNWIs as those who hold at least US$1 million in assets excluding primary residence and UHNWIs as those who hold at least US$30 million in assets excluding primary residence.

The report states that in 2008 there were 8.6 million HNWIs worldwide, a decline of 14.9% from 2007. The total HNWI wealth worldwide totaled US$32.8 trillion, a 19.5% decrease from 2007. The UHNWIs experienced the greater loss, losing 24.6% in population and 23.9% in accumulated wealth. The report revised its 2007 projections that HNWI financial wealth would reach US$59.1 trillion by 2012 and revised this downward to a 2013 HNWI wealth valued at $48.5 trillion advancing at an annual rate of 8.1%. The "World Ultra Wealth Report", on UHNW populations—those with "$30m or more in net worth"—which was published on June 27, 2017, "this year revealed global growth of 3.5% to 226,450 individuals and a 1.5% increase of their total combined wealth to $27 trillion."

The 2018 World Wealth Report was jointly produced by Capgemini and RBC Wealth Management and included, for the first time, the Global HNW Insights Survey produced in collaboration with Scorpio Partnership. The inaugural survey represented one of the largest and most in-depth surveys of HNWIs ever conducted, surveying more than 4,400 across 21 major wealth markets in North America, Latin America, Europe, Asia-Pacific, Middle East, and Africa.

HNWI wealth distribution by region (2024)
Region	HNWI population (millions)	HNWI wealth (trillions USD)	Wealth per person (millions USD)
Global	23.413	90.475	3.864
North America	8.448	29.927	3.542
Asia-Pacific	7.591	26.920	3.546
Europe	5.706	19.000	3.330
Middle East	0.879	3.545	4.033
Latin America	0.587	9.158	15.601
Africa	0.202	1.925	9.530

The World Wealth Report has estimated the number and combined investable wealth of high-net-worth individuals as follows (using the United States Consumer Price Index (CPI) Inflation Calculator):

World Wealth Report Findings (2008–2024)
Year	Number of HNWIs (millions)	Total wealth of HNWIs (trillions USD)	Wealth per person (millions USD)
2008	8.579	32.773	3.820
2009	10.043	38.957	3.879
2010	10.872	42.725	3.930
2011	10.963	42.004	3.831
2012	11.975	46.222	3.860
2013	13.730	52.623	3.833
2014	14.650	56.403	3.850
2015	15.365	58.668	3.818
2016	16.515	63.460	3.843
2017	18.083	70.168	3.880
2018	18.023	68.101	3.779
2019	19.608	73.961	3.772
2020	20.838	79.576	3.819
2021	22.459	85.978	3.828
2022	21.711	82.919	3.819
2023	22.828	86.790	3.802
2024	23.413	90.475	3.864

== Markets ==
Certain products cater to the wealthy, whose conspicuous consumption of luxury goods and services includes, such as: mansions, yachts, first-class airline tickets and private jets, and personal umbrella insurance. As economic growth has made historically expensive items affordable for the middle-class, purchases have trended towards intangible products such as education. In the United States, concierge medicine is an emerging trend as of 2017.

=== Banking and finance ===
Most global banks, such as Barclays, BNP Paribas, Citibank, Deutsche Bank, HSBC, JPMorgan Chase, and UBS, have a separate business unit with designated teams consisting of client advisors and product specialists exclusively for UHNWI. These clients are often considered to have characteristics similar to institutional investors because the vast majority of their net worth and current income is derived from passive sources rather than labor. By 2006, asset managers working for HNW individuals invested more than £300 billion on behalf of their clients. These wealth managers are bankers who in 2006, earned multimillion-pound salaries and owned their own companies and equity funds. In 2006, a list of the 50 top investment bankers was published by the Spear's Wealth Management Survey.

=== Other ===
Certain magazines, such as Monocle, Robb Report, and Worth, are designed for a high net worth audience. By 2012, according to Reuters, the UHNW individuals held $32 trillion in offshore havens, representing $280 billion in lost income tax revenues. Brands in various sectors, such as Bentley, Maybach, and Rolls-Royce actively target UHNWI and HNWI to sell their products. In 2006, Rolls-Royce researchers suggested there were 80,000 people in ultra-high-net-worth category around the world. UHNW individuals "have, on average, eight cars and three or four homes. Three-quarters own a jet aircraft and most have a yacht."

== Number of UHNWIs by city ==
There are three sources compiling these statistics for cities: the most recent data is from Altrata, which found that the three cities with the highest number of ultra-high net worth individuals, as of 2025, were New York City (33,222), Los Angeles (19,781) and Hong Kong (19,439). Below is the ranking from the Wealth-X Report:

2025 Wealth-X Report
Rank	City	Number of UHNWIs (20)
1	(United States) New York City	33,222
2	(United States) Los Angeles	19,781
3	Hong Kong	19,439
4	(United States) Miami	17,457
5	(United Kingdom) London	15,695
6	(United States) San Francisco	14,341
7	(United States) Chicago	9,463
8	Singapore	9,061
9	(United States) Washington, D.C.	8,872
10	(United States) Boston	8,633

== UHNW characteristics ==
World UHNW distribution by wealth tier
Net worth tier US$ millions	2013		2012		2012–2013	
Net worth tier US$ millions	Numbers of UHNWs	Total wealth US$ billions	Numbers of UHNWs	Total wealth US$ billions	Increase in numbers of UHNWs	Increase in Total wealth
$1000+	2,170	6,516	2,160	6,190	0.5%	5.3%
$750 to $999	1,080	929	990	855	9.1%	8.7%
$500 to $749	2,660	1,695	2,475	1,560	7.5%	8.7%
$250 to $499	8,695	3,420	8,090	3,225	7.5%	6.0%
$200 to $249	14,185	3,205	13,500	3,035	5.1%	5.6%
$100 to $199	23,835	3,780	22,290	3,335	6.9%	13.3%
$50 to $99	60,760	4,720	56,205	4,295	8.1%	9.9%
$30 to $49	85,850	3,505	81,670	3,280	5.1%	6.9%
Total	199,235	27,770	187,380	25,775	6.3%	7.7%

The Boston Consulting Group (BCG) 2014 Global Wealth Report shows that liquid wealth of the super-rich, referenced as Ultra-High-Net-Worth households, had increased by 20% in 2013. BCG uses a household definition of UHNW, which places only those with more than $100 million liquid financial wealth into the UHNW-category, more than the usual $30 million, with which the ultra-category had been created in 2007. They control 5.5% of global financial wealth. 5,000 of them live in the US, followed by China, Britain and Germany. BCG expects the trend toward more concentrated wealth to continue unabated. While financial wealth of the sub-millionaires is expected to increase by 3.7% annually until 2019, the expected growth rate for the super-rich is 9.1%.

67.7% of the world's UHNW population was self-made, 8.5% have fully inherited their wealth and 23.7% have both inherited and self-made wealth according to a 2018 report. According to the same report, twenty-three percent of self-made UHNW individuals have derived their wealth in finance, banking and investment, 8.5 percent in consumer and business services and 7.6 percent in real estate. The share of inherited and self-made wealth varied by country.

== Number of UHNWIs by country ==
The following is a list of the countries with the most Ultra high-net-worth individuals (UHNWI), as of 2026 as per the 2026 Knight Frank's Wealth Report, which it defines as person having net worth of $30 million or more. In South Africa, the term HNWI is often used by SARS to target affluent taxpayers for increased compliance and lifestyle audits.

Country	Number of UHNWIs (2026)	% of total
United States	251,352	35.2%
China	121,677	17.0%
Germany	38,215	5.4%
United Kingdom	28,876	4.0%
France	21,518	3.0%
India	19,877	2.8%
Japan	18,914	2.7%
Switzerland	17,692	2.5%
Australia	16,460	2.3%
Italy	15,433	2.2%
Canada	12,920	1.8%
Spain	9,186	1.3%
Russia	8,399	1.2%
Taiwan	7,640	1.0%
South Korea	7,310	1.0%
Singapore	7,171	1.0%
Sweden	6,845	0.9%
Hong Kong	6,788	0.9%
Brazil	5,808	0.8%
Israel	5,462	0.8%
Netherlands	5,077	0.7%
(United Arab Emirates) UAE	4,851	0.7%
Denmark	4,657	0.6%
Saudi Arabia	4,388	0.6%
Turkey	4,208	0.6%
Austria	4,188	0.5%
Mexico	3,860	0.5%
Indonesia	3,833	0.5%
Poland	3,017	0.4%
Thailand	2,853	0.4%
Norway	2,460	0.3%
Czech Republic	2,270	0.3%
Ireland	2,196	0.3%
Portugal	2,187	0.3%
Philippines	1,910	0.2%
New Zealand	1,710	0.2%
Malaysia	1,566	0.2%
Argentina	1,554	0.2%
South Africa	1,347	0.2%
Finland	1,317	0.2%
Vietnam	1,233	0.2%
Greece	910	0.1%
Qatar	838	0.1%
Egypt	822	0.1%
Romania	749	0.1%
Morocco	432	0.1%
Monaco	239	0.1%
World	713,626	100.0%
Other	21,411	3.0%

== UHNWI role in economies ==
UHNWIs are notable players in the field of philanthropy; many have their own private foundations and support a variety of causes, from education to poverty relief. Financial institutions are known for their targeting of UHNWIs, having specific parts of their bank designed to manage the wealth of their UHNW clients. In addition, research on the UHNW is particularly important with upcoming intergenerational wealth transfers in the UHNW population. For example, as of 2014, luxury companies typically target UHNW as a separate segment of their clientele. Daily Finance in 2014, projected that growth in Asia's UHNW population looked promising for the future of the luxury industry.

The India's Economic Times said in 2014 that, despite the luxury industry's troubled year with China's luxury spenders, luxury industry experts continued to be optimistic for their long-term performance, especially from UHNWIs. According to Savills and Wealth-X, in 2014, UHNWIs are particularly relevant to the real estate sector, with the total UHNW population's real estate holdings accounting for over US$5 trillion by 2014, or 3% of the world's real estate holdings. This is a huge proportion considering this population is only 0.003% of the world's population.

== See also ==
- Economic inequality
- Global assets under management
- Plutonomy
- Politically exposed person
- Professional
- List of countries by wealth per adult
- Senior management
- Wealthy peasant
