= Chartered IT Professional =

Designation awarded by the British Computer Society for experienced ICT professionals

Chartered IT Professional (in full, Chartered Information Technology Professional) denoted by CITP is a professional qualification awarded under Royal Charter to IT professionals who satisfy strict criteria set by the British Computer Society (BCS), which is a professional body for IT in the United Kingdom.

== Status ==
The title Chartered IT Professional is aligned with Skills Framework for the Information Age (SFIA), the UK Government backed competency framework, CITP is the benchmark of IT excellence and is terminal (final/top most) qualification in IT.

Criteria and requirements for chartered status in the UK have to be approved by the Privy Council and as such the CITP designation is on par with other chartered qualifications in other fields (such as the Chartered Accountant qualification awarded by the ICAEW).

CITP status is gaining increasing national and international recognition as the benchmark of excellence for IT professionals. It provides evidence of an individual’s commitment to their profession and endorsement of their experience and knowledge.

== Eligibility ==
In order to qualify for this award a person normally needs to have at least 8 to 10 years professional experience in IT, with evidence of experience at a senior level (5) in the Skills Framework for the Information Age (SFIA), have passed a professional competency examination and successfully completed a skills assessment interview with two BCS assessors.

A fast track scheme exists for holders of Certified Architect and Certified IT Specialist certifications from The Open Group, which exempts applicants from the initial review and interview elements of the application process.

In order to maintain a certificate of current competence, demonstrable CPD must be undertaken.

== Designatory lettering ==
Chartered IT Professionals are entitled to use the suffix CITP after their names. This is written after honours, decorations and university degrees and before letters denoting membership of professional engineering institutions - for example: BSc (Hons) CITP MBCS.

The BCS maintains an online register of members with CITP status.

== Licensing ==
Other Professional membership bodies apply to the BCS for a licence that enables them to award CITP to their eligible members.

=== Ireland ===
The Irish Computer Society is the awarding body of CITP status in Ireland. The standard has been developed in consultation with BCS and applicants undergo the same assessment process.

=== New Zealand ===
The Institute of IT Professionals New Zealand is licensed to award CITP status in New Zealand. The body extends the CITP standard to CITPNZ, incorporating additional requirements such as mandatory practicing certificate to retain the designation.

=== United Kingdom ===
The Institution of Engineering and Technology (IET) was the first membership body licensed to award CITP, but the agreement ended on 22 February 2020.
