= Risk and Insurance Management Society =

Nonprofit organization dedicated to advancing risk management

The Risk and Insurance Management Society, Inc. (RIMS) is a professional association dedicated to advancing the practice of risk management. It was founded in 1950, and is headquartered in Manhattan, New York City, United States. It publishes the industry-focused Risk Management magazine.

RIMS represents more than 3,500 industrial, service, nonprofit, charitable and governmental entities. The society serves more than 10,000 risk management professionals around the world. There are 79 chapters across the United States, Canada, Mexico, Japan, Australasia and New Zealand.

The Risk Maturity Model is an online assessment tool for enterprise risk management (ERM). Developed in 2006 by LogicManager, it has been recognized as a best practice framework by several national organizations. Over 2,000 corporates and organizations have baselined their ERM maturity with the Risk Maturity Model.

Given appropriate experience and educational background, RIMS offers the certification RIMS-CRMP (RIMS Certified Risk Management Professional) and the professional designations CRM (Canadian Risk Management) and RF (RIMS Fellow); various intermediate designations are available via certification exams.

== See also ==
Institutions

- American Risk and Insurance Association
- Association of Insurance and Risk Managers in Industry and Commerce
- Institute of Risk Management
- Professional Risk Managers' International Association
- Global Association of Risk Professionals

Certifications

- Certified Risk Analyst (CRA)
- Certified Risk Professional
- Chartered Enterprise Risk Actuary
- Chartered Enterprise Risk Analyst
- Financial Risk Manager (FRM)
- Professional Risk Manager (PRM)
