= Risk Management (magazine) =

Magazine

Risk Management is a magazine dedicated to issues of interest to practicing risk managers. It is published by the Risk and Insurance Management Society.

The editor-in-chief is Morgan O'Rourke.
