= Insurance Institute of Canada =

- Institut d'assurance du Canada
- Formation: 1952; 74 years ago
- Type: Not-for-profit organization
- Chair: Martin Thompson
- Website: insuranceinstitute.ca

The Insurance Institute of Canada is a not-for-profit organization which provides nationally standardized professional development programs for the insurance industry in Canada. Founded in 1952 and headquartered in Toronto, the IIC is an umbrella organization of 19 provincial and regional chapters across Canada.

The institute serves as a professional educator, examining body and publishing house. It develops and administers licensing exams, Membership is open to Canadian reinsurers, underwriters, brokers, independent adjusters, and other professionals in related financial services.

The Institute offers two formal designation programs for insurance professionals; The Chartered Insurance Professional (CIP) and the Fellow Chartered Insurance Professional (FCIP).

== Membership ==
The Institute has over 43,000 members. They can be students or graduates of the CIP or FCIP designation programs or certificate programs.

== Professional Development and Designations ==
The Institute offers four different areas of professional development. The Academic Division runs the education programs.

=== Professional Designations ===
Professional designation programs include formal education leading to CIP and FCIP designations in the classroom, distance learning and web-based learning. The Institute normally has about 20,000 students studying in programs at community colleges and universities in Canada, The Institute uses the CIP program to educate full-time students of property and casualty insurance.

=== Insurance Licensing & CE Credits ===
The Institute offers licensing and continuing education (CE) credits to insurance agents and brokers, independent claims adjusters and life agents. It also offers certificate programs such as the GIE Program, the Rehabilitation Benefits Administration Program, the LLQP, and the ICP.

=== Professional Development ===
The Institute provides non-designation courses and seminars, both In-class and virtual. They deal with subject areas such as insurance and technical knowledge, business and management, as well as interpersonal and communications skills.

=== CIP program ===
The Chartered Insurance Professional (CIP) Program provides general and technical knowledge specific to the Canadian property and casualty insurance industry, leading to a CIP designation. It is a uniform standard indicating that all CIPs have met the same test of knowledge.

The CIP Program is for those studying to become an insurance broker or agent, underwriter, adjuster or risk manager. It consists of approximately 30 courses, 10 of which are required.

The 10 required CIP courses include:

- Five mandatory courses
- Three applied professional courses. These courses give students an opportunity to shape their learning according to specific career interests, such as being underwriters, adjusters or broker/agents.
- Two elective courses

There is a one-year industry experience requirement to graduate.

=== FCIP Program ===
The Fellow Chartered Insurance Professional (FCIP) Program is a designation program for Canada's property and casualty (p&c) insurance industry.

The Institute established the FCIP curriculum in the 1950s. During the late 1970s, the program was revised by approving a set of university based subjects for the program. FCIP candidates then took any of these approved courses, which were offered primarily through the continuing education departments of universities.

The FCIP Program was re-launched in 2010. The current FCIP program includes six courses, developed at a post-degree level, that are tailored specifically to the Canadian p&c sector.

The Institute developed the current FCIP in collaboration with senior industry executives and academics from business schools The virtual program is designed to provide a comprehensive, insurance-focused understanding of strategic leadership and advanced management techniques, leading to the FCIP designation.

More than 3,500 people across Canada hold an FCIP, FIIC, FPAA or FIAC designation.

The FCIP Program follows a progression of the following six courses, which are taken sequentially

== Networking and Career Development ==
The CIP Society is a networking group that provides networking and social programs for the 17,000 graduates of the CIP and FCIP programs. The Graduate Division administers the CIP Society.

The Career Connections program maintains an insurance presence in secondary and post-secondary schools, educating young adults about the fundamental concepts of insurance and career opportunities available in the industry. It is run by the Career Connections Division.

== Insight and Resources ==
The Institute authors annual reports, newsletters, industry surveys and research, instructor exchanges, legal briefs, CIP and FCIP textbooks for its members.

== Standards ==
Graduates of Institute programs are obliged to abide by a Code of Ethics designed to maintain professional practice and conduct. As a designation-granting institution, the Insurance Institute holds qualifying examinations and elects graduates as CIPs and FCIPs.

== Corporate Governance ==
The Institute Board of Governors meets once annually to receive reports, address policy issues and approve finances for the organization. It includes executives from major insurance employers and representatives of local institute councils.

The Executive Committee is the senior decision-making body within the Board of Governors. It also oversees its four sub-committees (Finance, Nominations, Pension and Compensation).

== Involvement in the Insurance Community ==
The Insurance Institute is a platinum sponsor of the National Insurance Conference of Canada. Other philanthropic commitments include: the Women in Insurance Cancer Crusade event, Toronto Insurance Women's Association and the Canadian Association of Insurance Women.

In 2009, the institute inaugurated the National Education Week. Normally held the last week of February, special events, seminars and networking opportunities take place within each institute and chapter, often organized with national subscribing companies.

== Institute History ==
1899 – John B. Laidlaw, manager of the Norwich Union Fire Insurance Society in Canada, contacted insurance managers across Canada to create an insurance institute in Canada like the institutes being formed in Great Britain in the late 1870s. Two hundred and thirty industry representatives responded, forming to the Insurance Institute of Toronto.

1900 – The Insurance Institute of Montreal formed.

1920s – The Insurance Institute of British Columbia and the Insurance Institute of Winnipeg were established.

1931 – President of the Insurance Institute of Toronto, W.H. Burgess, first raised the idea of a national institute.

1947 – The Insurance Institute of Toronto became the Insurance Institute of Ontario.

1952 – All institutes joined in association with The Insurance Institute of Canada to establish a uniform standard of insurance education and examinations. The first president of the Insurance Institute, Norman G. Bethune, outlined the following three major objectives for the organization in the President's Address to The First Annual Meeting of the Insurance Institute of Canada:

- The standardization of insurance education across Canada, with a uniform syllabus, uniform examinations, and consequently equal standing for all graduates regardless of education.
- A sound and equitable basis of company support of Insurance Institute work.
- To provide means of insurance education in other parts of Canada where it is needed.

As initially stated in the resolutions establishing The Insurance Institute of Canada, the purpose of the organization was "to co-operate with all organisations, both insurance and educational, in the interests of insurance education, all to the end that the service of the business to the insuring public and to Canada generally will be maintained and enhanced, and the efficiency, progress and general development of the business will be promoted." A contemporary example of co-operating with other industry organizations to further insurance education can be found on the website of the Insurance Bureau of Canada (IBC), a trade organization for Canada's home, auto and business insurers.

1998 – The CIP Society was officially sanctioned and the new designations were approved.

2002 – 50th anniversary celebration for the Insurance Institute.
