= Irish Human Rights Commission =

The Irish Human Rights Commission (IHRC) was a public body, state-funded but independent of government, that promoted and protected human rights in the Republic of Ireland. It was established on 23 July 2001 under the Human Rights Commission Act 2000. In November 2014, it and the separate Equality Authority were transformed into a new single statutory body, the Irish Human Rights and Equality Commission.

As one of the two national human rights institutions (NHRIs) on the island of Ireland, like the Northern Ireland Human Rights Commission (NIHRC) its creation was a consequence of the Belfast (Good Friday) Agreement of 10 April 1998. It was required to maintain a joint committee with the NIHRC to consider human rights issues affecting both jurisdictions, such as a possible Charter of Rights for the Island of Ireland.

The IHRC had a full-time president and 14 part-time commissioners, who served for five-year terms. The first president was Donal Barrington, a retired judge of the Supreme Court of Ireland. He was succeeded in August 2002 by former Fine Gael senator Dr Maurice Manning.

The functions of the IHRC included advising on the compatibility of legislation with the rights protected by the Constitution of Ireland and by international treaties to which the state is party. It also engaged in human rights education and conducted inquiries into alleged violations of human rights.
