= Chartist (occupation) =

Analyst of stock market charts etc. to make predictions

A chartist (also known as a technical trader or technical analyst) is one who utilizes charts to assess patterns of activity that might be helpful in making predictions. Most commonly, chartists use technical analysis in the financial world to evaluate financial securities. For example, a chartist may plot past values of stock prices in an attempt to denote a trend from which he or she might infer future stock prices. The chartist's philosophy is that "history repeats itself". Technical analysis assumes that a stock's price reflects all that is known about a company at any given point in time.

== See also ==
- Elliott wave principle
- Efficient-market hypothesis
- Professional designations:
  - Chartered Market Technician
  - Certified Financial Technician
