= American Risk and Insurance Association =

American Financial Association

The American Risk and Insurance Association (ARIA) is a professional association that focuses on studying and promoting knowledge of risk management and insurance. It was formed in 1932 and publishes two journals: Journal of Risk and Insurance and Risk Management and Insurance Review. The association also hosts an annual meeting.

== History ==
The association was formed in 1932.

Presidents
Year	President	Affiliation
1990–1991	Sandra G. Gustavson	University of Georgia
1991–1992	Scott E. Harrington	University of South Carolina
1992–1993	Jerry L. Jorgensen	University of Calgary
1993–1994	Harold D. Skipper Jr.	Georgia State University
1994–1995	Joan Schmit	University of Wisconsin–Madison
1995–1996	Norma Nielson	Oregon State University
1996–1997	Bruce A. Palmer	Georgia State University
1997–1998	Harris Schlesinger	University of Alabama
1998–1999	Stephen P. D'Arcy	University of Illinois at Urbana–Champaign
1999–2000	Jack M. Nelson	College of Insurance
2000–2001	Helen I. Doerpinghaus	University of South Carolina
2001–2002	Patrick L. Brockett	University of Texas at Austin
2002–2003	Mark J. Browne	University of Wisconsin–Madison
2003–2004	Robert E. Hoyt	University of Georgia
2004–2005	James M. Carson	Florida State University
2005–2006	Larry Cox	The University of Mississippi
2006–2007	James Garven	Baylor University
2007–2008	Mary A. Weiss	Temple University
2008–2009	Terri Vaughan	NAIC/Drake University
2009–2010	Vickie Bajtelsmit	Colorado State University
2010–2011	Gene Lai	Washington State University
2011–2012	David Sommer	St. Mary's University
2012–2013	George Zanjani	Georgia State University
2013–2014	Laureen Regan	Temple University

== See also ==
- Association of Insurance and Risk Managers in Industry and Commerce
- Institute of Risk Management
- Professional Risk Managers' International Association
- Risk and Insurance Management Society
- Global Association of Risk Professionals
