= Journal of Risk and Insurance =

- Discipline: Insurance, risk management
- Language: English
- Edited by: Joan T. Schmit

Publication details
- Former name(s): The Journal of Insurance, The Review of Insurance Studies, Journal of The American Association of University Teachers of Insurance, Proceedings of the Annual Meeting (American Association of University Teachers of Insurance)
- History: 1933-present
- Publisher: Wiley on behalf of the American Risk and Insurance Association (United States)
- Frequency: Quarterly
- Impact factor: 1.803 (2020)

Standard abbreviations
- ISO 4: J. Risk Insur.

Indexing
- ISSN: 0022-4367 (print); 1539-6975 (web)
- LCCN: 79616547
- JSTOR: 00224367
- OCLC no.: 473366051

Links
- Journal homepage; Journal page at publisher's website; Online access; Online archive

The Journal of Risk and Insurance is a quarterly peer-reviewed academic journal covering insurance economics and risk management. The journal is published by Wiley on behalf of the American Risk and Insurance Association. The current editor-in-chief is Joan T. Schmit (University of Wisconsin-Madison). The journal was established in 1933 as the Proceedings of the Annual Meeting (American Association of University Teachers of Insurance) and renamed Journal of The American Association of University Teachers of Insurance in 1937. From 1954 until 1956 it was known as The Review of Insurance Studies and from 1957 to 1963 as The Journal of Insurance, before obtaining its current title.

== Abstracting and indexing ==
The journal is abstracted and indexed in the Social Sciences Citation Index, the Economic Literature Index, Scopus, InfoTrac, RePEc, and other databases. According to the Journal Citation Reports, the journal has a 2020 impact factor of 1.803.
