= Irish Computer Society =

The Irish Computer Society (ICS)
- Founded: 1967
- Type: Learned society Professional body
- Location: 20 Harcourt Street, Dublin
- Region served: Ireland
- Website: http://www.ics.ie

Irish Computer Society was founded in 1967 as the professional representing information and communication technology professionals in Ireland.

Its objective is to promote professional information and computer skills. The ICS is a member of the Council of European Professional Informatics Societies. In 1997 the ICS co-founded European Computer Driving Licence (Ireland).

The Irish Computer Society host seminars, workshops and conferences on current topics of interest and also conduct surveys of trends in the industry. National events include the National Data Protection Conference, the Public Sector IT Conference, the Leaders Conference, and in 2014 they ran the first Tech Week Ireland with 42,000 people taking part all over Ireland.

The ICS run a variety of courses aimed at those in the IT Industry. There is a QQI Level 8 programme run with the National College of Ireland and an MSc run in conjunction with the Irish Association of Software Architects and the Technological University of Dublin(Tallaght). The Chartered IT Professional qualification is offered by the ICS on licence from the British Computer Society.

The ICS has also made representations and submissions to government committees and forums (for example of e-voting), where ICT knowledge is beneficial and on areas of concern for ICT professionals.

The ICS is a nomination body for the Industrial and Commercial Panel for Seanad Éireann. The ICS promotes ICT skills in schools by information campaigns and sponsoring competitions.

== Membership ==
The ICS has different grades of membership dependent on the qualifications.

- Student
- Affiliate
- Associate
- Member
- Fellow
