= Professional certification in financial services =

Following is a partial list of professional certifications in financial services, with an overview of the educational and continuing requirements for each; see Professional certification § Accountancy, auditing and finance and Category:Professional certification in finance for all articles.

As the field of finance has increased in complexity in recent years, the number of available designations has grown, and, correspondingly, some will have more recognition than others.

In the US, many state securities and insurance regulators do not allow financial professionals to use a designation — in particular a "senior" designation — unless it has been accredited by either the American National Standards Institute or the National Commission for Certifying Agencies.

== Investments ==
=== Certified Futures and Options Analyst ===
The Certified Futures and Options Analyst (CFOA) is a professional certification focused specifically on financial derivatives, futures and options trading, pricing models, and risk management. It is issued by the International Council for Derivative Trading (ICFDT). Candidates must pass a single multiple-choice examination covering derivatives theory, strategies and risk control, of 100 questions completed in 80 minutes. The curriculum covers derivatives market history, options structure and pricing, volatility analysis, options trading strategies, futures contracts, futures trading strategies, margin and settlement, hedging, and risk management. The certification is awarded for life with no ongoing membership or renewal fees.

In February 2026, ICFDT made a formal submission to the U.S. Commodity Futures Trading Commission in response to a request for comment on derivatives clearing, citing the CFOA in its recommendations concerning professional competency standards.

=== Certificate in Investment Performance Measurement ===
The Certificate in Investment Performance Measurement (CIPM) is a professional accreditation in the field of investment performance analysis. It includes investment performance measurement and attribution. It is offered by the CIPM Association, a body associated with the CFA Institute.

=== Certified International Investment Analyst ===
Certified International Investment Analyst (CIIA) is an internationally recognised advanced professional qualification for individuals working in the finance and investment industry. The CIIA maintains standards both at the national and international levels: ACIIA tests candidates at the local level (at their home country), and, having cleared those country specific exams, at the common international level. The topics are largely similar to the CFA; see below.

=== Chartered Alternative Investment Analyst ===
The Chartered Alternative Investment Analyst (CAIA) designation is a financial certification for investment professionals conferred by the CAIA Association. The curriculum is designed to provide finance professionals with a broad base of knowledge in alternative investments. Candidates must complete two examinations in succession and pay an ongoing certification fee to retain rights to use the financial designation.

=== Chartered Financial Analyst ===
The Chartered Financial Analyst (CFA) is a post-graduate professional qualification offered internationally by the American-based CFA Institute. The program covers a considerably wide range of topics relating to advanced investment management and security analysis - thus economics, financial reporting and analysis, corporate finance, alternative investments and portfolio management - and provides a generalist knowledge of other areas of finance. The program consists of three examinations in succession, each about four and a half hours long. To attain the Charter, candidates require three years work experience; thereafter they must adhere to a code of ethics, and pay an ongoing certification fee to retain rights to use the designation.

=== Chartered Financial Intelligence Architect ===
The Chartered Financial Intelligence Architect (CFIA) is a professional designation issued by the International Council for Derivative Trading (ICFDT), focused on the application, governance and oversight of artificial intelligence in investment management. The qualification requires candidates to pass a 200-question proctored examination and complete 20 hours of continuing professional development annually.

=== Chartered Wealth Manager ===
For retail focused professionals, CISI - the UK based Chartered Institute for Securities & Investment - offers the Chartered Wealth Manager Qualification (CWM), comprising three sequential exams in financial markets, portfolio construction, and then applied wealth management. With further experience requirements met, the Chartered Wealth Manager title may be used additional to other CISI membership designations.

=== CISI Diploma ===
The CISI Diploma in Capital Markets, also offered by CISI, is a leading qualification for practitioners working in wholesale securities markets. It comprises sequential modules in (i) financial securities, (ii) financial markets, and then (iii) a role specific selection from fixed income, derivatives, or fund management. The three exams typically take between 18 months and two years to complete. Candidates become full Members and may use the post-nominal "MCSI". It was previously known as the "SII Diploma".

=== Development Finance Certified Professional ===
A Development Finance Certified Professional (DFCP) is a specialist in development finance theory and practice that has been professionally accredited by the Chartered Institute of Development Finance; the professional association which engages with academic institutions, development finance institutions, and support agencies to support and maintain ethical conduct and professionalism in the development finance discipline globally. It is the highest professional qualification for development finance practitioners.

== Financial planning ==
=== Accredited Investment Fiduciary ===
The Accredited Investment Fiduciary (AIF) certification, awarded by fI360, is a financial advisory designation relevant to private wealth, retirement, and foundations / endowment funds, emphasizing the inherent fiduciary roles and responsibilities. It is awarded to candidates with approved education and industry experience (8 years if no degree), following completion of training and a two hour examination. Ongoing requirements include adherence to an Ethics Code and continuing education.

=== Certified Financial Planner ===
The Certified Financial Planner (CFP) designation is a certification mark for financial planners conferred by the CFP Board of Standards. To receive authorization to use the designation, the candidate must meet education, examination, experience and ethics requirements, and pay an ongoing certification fee. It is offered in the United States, and in 25 other countries through affiliated organizations.

=== Chartered Financial Consultant ===
The Chartered Financial Consultant (ChFC) is the "advanced financial planning" designation awarded by The American College of Financial Services. To secure the designation, applicants must have three years of full-time business experience within the preceding five years and must complete nine college-level courses; the award is also contingent on adherence to a set of ethical guidelines. The designation exempts one from sitting the Series 65 examination.

=== Chartered Financial Divorce Analyst ===
Chartered Financial Divorce Analyst (CFDA) refers to the Canadian designation for specialists facilitating objective financial analysis for families & individuals going through divorce, marital separation or legal separation and life transitions. The regulating body is the Academy of Financial Divorce Specialists (AFDS). Members are required to have an existing financial designation and be in good standing to be eligible for the course. Once passing, members must maintain credentials and ongoing annual education, and application/work in field.

=== Chartered Financial Planner ===
The Chartered Financial Planner is a designation awarded by the UK based Chartered Insurance Institute. To attain "Chartered status" the candidate must sit 14 exams, and have five years relevant experience. Thereafter continued learning is required annually.

=== Fellow Chartered Financial Practitioner ===
The Fellow Chartered Financial Practitioner (FChFP) designation is a financial planning designation issued by the Asia Pacific Financial Services Association (APFinSA). Candidates must have 2 years of full-time experience, and then pass 6 exams. The designation was developed by the National Association of Malaysian Life Insurance and Financial Advisors (NAMLIFA) in 1996 and later on adopted by APFinSA (of which NAMLIFA is a member) in 2001 as the flagship designation for its 11 member associations.

=== Registered Financial Planner ===
Registered Financial Planner (RFP) refers to one of several separate designations in financial planning; there is currently no connection between these.

- In Canada, the RFP designation is conferred by the Institute of Advanced Financial Planners. To become an RFP in Canada, candidates must pass exams, submit a sample comprehensive financial plan and meet education and experience requirements; IQPF awards the Financial Planner (F.Pl.) diploma in Quebec.
- In Malaysia, the Registered Financial Planner (RFP) designation is conferred by the Malaysian Financial Planning Council (MFPC). It is one of the recognised qualification by the Securities Commission and Bank Negara Malaysia for those wishing to apply for a financial planner or financial adviser licence. See Financial Planners in Malaysia.
- In the United States, the RFP designation is offered by the Registered Financial Planners Institute. The designation requires 2 years relevant experience, and 120 hours of course-based study.
- In Hong Kong, the Society of Registered Financial Planners offers the HKRFP, valid in Hong Kong and China.

== Technical analysis ==
=== Certified Financial Technician ===
The Certified Financial Technician (CFTe) is a designation in technical analysis offered by the International Federation of Technical Analysts (IFTA). It comprises two sequential examinations, usually completed over two years; to register candidates require a bachelor's degree and three years' relevant experience. Once qualified, a CFTe may pursue the MFTA (Master of Financial Technical Analysis), requiring submission of a research thesis. Members are in 22 countries.

=== Chartered Market Technician ===
The Chartered Market Technician (CMT) is a designation in technical analysis offered by the CMT Association. The program comprises three examination levels, certifying that the individual is competent in the use of technical analysis, and knowledgeable re the underlying theory. To earn the designation, candidates must hold a degree, and have three years relevant experience.

=== Diploma in Technical Analysis ===
The STA Diploma in Technical Analysis is a designation in Technical analysis offered by the UK based Society of Technical Analysts (STA). It comprises two sequential examinations. The qualification is accredited by the International Federation of Technical Analysts and the Chartered Institute for Securities & Investment. Designants are also entitled to the above Certified Financial Technician (CFTe) designation and certain Chartered Wealth Management Qualification (CWM) exemptions.

== Corporate finance ==
=== Corporate Finance Qualification ===
CISI, in conjunction with ICAEW, offers the two tiered Certificate, and then Diploma in Corporate Finance. The qualification is "designed with a focus on the commercial, practical and technical skills" applicable in corporate finance. With three years appropriate experience, these lead to the ICAEW Corporate Finance (CF) designatory letters, and to full CISI Chartered Member status.

=== FP&A Professional ===
The Certified Corporate FP&A Professional, or "FPAC", is a designation conferred by the Association for Financial Professionals (AFP), known for their CTP treasury qualification covered below. The FPAC syllabus is over two exams: the first 3-hour paper, covers underlying knowledge of financial planning and analysis; the second 4.5 hour paper, is a case-based test of applied analytics and business support. Certificants have three years experience and hold a relevant degree or other qualification; AFP thereafter specifies continuing education requirements.

=== International Certificate in Corporate Finance ===
The International Certificate in Corporate Finance (ICCF) is a professional designation for employees in corporate finance, covering financial analysis, valuation and decision making. The program comprises three 6-week online courses, three major cases studies, and a 2-hour final exam. The program is delivered by First Finance Institute in partnership with the following four business schools: HEC Paris, Columbia, Wharton and IE Business School.

== Risk management and quantitative finance ==
=== Certificate in Quantitative Finance ===
The Certificate in Quantitative Finance (CQF) is an online part-time financial engineering program; it was founded by Paul Wilmott in 2003, and is conferred by the CQF Institute. The CQF can be completed as a single six-month program or split into two three-month levels. It is designed for in-depth training for individuals in derivatives, IT, quantitative trading, insurance, model validation or risk management. The program's focus is on the practical implementation of techniques ("real-world quantitative finance"), it thus incorporates an element of questioning and analyzing models and methods; it assumes some background in mathematics and programming. See also under Quantitative analysis (finance) § Education, Financial engineering § Education, and Financial modeling § Quantitative finance.

=== Certified Risk Management Professional ===
The Certified Risk Management Professional (RIMS-CRMP) is an enterprise risk management (ERM) focused credential offered by RIMS, the Risk and Insurance Management Society. Candidates sit a two-hour competency based exam, and require a Bachelor's degree majoring in Risk Management together with a year's appropriate experience (or more with other qualifications); certificants are then required to uphold a Code of Ethics and meet continuing education requirements in order to maintain the certification. (A similarly named certificate is offered by IRMSA in South Africa.)

=== Certified Risk Professional ===
"Certified Risk Professional" is a graduate-level qualification offered by the Institute of Risk Management (IRM), allowing for the post nominal designation "CMIRM". It is achieved by completing a certificate and then diploma, together with three year's relevant experience. The International Certificate in Financial Services Risk Management, comprises two modules, usually taken over 9 months; with four further modules, over three years, the certificant articulates to the ERM focused International Diploma in Risk Management, thereby qualifying. (Several UK universities have MSc programmes aligned with these; students may gain exemption from specified modules.) At the certificate level IRM also offers the International Certificate in Enterprise Risk Management, as well as others.

=== Chartered Enterprise Risk Actuary / Analyst ===
The CERA credential — Chartered Enterprise Risk Actuary through the Institute and Faculty of Actuaries, and Chartered Enterprise Risk Analyst through the Society of Actuaries — provides risk professionals with "strong ERM knowledge that drives better business decisions applied in finance and insurance". Under both, certificants have completed various of the underlying actuarial qualifying exams, as well as further specified modules and training in risk management.

=== Financial Risk Manager ===
The Financial Risk Manager (FRM) is a professional certification in risk management offered by the Global Association of Risk Professionals (GARP). The coverage - focusing on market risk, credit risk and operational risk, and including requisite quantitative and investment management material - is over two exams. Certificants are in more than 190 countries and territories worldwide, and have taken an average of two years to earn their Certification.

=== Professional Risk Manager ===
The Professional Risk Manager certification (PRM), offered by PRMIA, emphasizes practice-related skills and knowledge required within the risk management profession, and financial risk management more particularly; its coverage, structure and recognition are similar to the FRM. It additionally requires a commitment to professional ethics, and 20 annual hours of continuing education.

== Treasury management ==
=== Association of Corporate Treasurers ===
The Association of Corporate Treasurers offers training and various qualifications in cash- and treasury management. The Diploma in Treasury Management (3 papers over 12–18 months) allows for Associate Membership, with post-nominal letters AMCT, while the subsequent Advanced Diploma (of similar structure and duration, and requiring also a dissertation) grants full membership, MCT. The FCT fellowship is conferred following several years of experience.

=== Certified Treasury Professional ===
The Certified Treasury Professional (CTP) designation is a certification for treasurers, cash managers, treasury managers, and other treasury-related professionals administered by the Association for Financial Professionals (AFP). The CTP was formerly known as the Certified Cash Manager or CCM designation but was renamed due to treasury's increasing role in managing the entire balance sheet and implementing the strategic direction prescribed by Chief Financial Officers. The CTP certification is held by over 20,000 finance professionals and, in the US, is considered the leading certification in the treasury management profession.

== See also ==
- Professional certification and esp. § Accountancy, auditing and finance
- Other organizations offering training, with certification:
  - Amsterdam Institute of Finance
  - Canadian Securities Institute
  - Chartered Institute for Securities & Investment
  - GARP
  - Global Risk Institute
  - ICMA Centre
  - The London Institute of Banking & Finance
  - New York Institute of Finance
  - PRMIA
  - South African Institute of Financial Markets
  - Swiss Finance Institute
- Related education articles:
  - Accounting articles
  - Economics articles
  - Finance articles
  - Management articles
  - Business articles
  - Investments education
  - Quantitative finance- / Financial engineering education
- List of securities examinations
