= Global Association of Risk Professionals =

Membership association for risk managers

- Abbreviation: GARP
- Formation: 1996
- Founders: Marc Lore; Lev Borodovsky
- Type: Not-for-profit organization
- Purpose: Risk Management Education and Certification
- Headquarters: Jersey City, New Jersey
- Coordinates: 40°43′34.62″N 74°2′1.43″W
- Region served: Worldwide
- Members: 279,000 (2021)
- Official language: English
- Chairman of the Board of Trustees: Bradford Hu
- President & CEO: Richard Apostolik
- Revenue: ▲US$56.78 million (2021)
- Expenses: ▲US$47.56 million (2021)
- Students: 84,925 (2021, FRM and SCR registrations)
- Website: www.garp.org

Global Association of Risk Professionals (GARP) is a not-for-profit organization and a membership association for risk managers. Its services include setting standards, training, education, industry networking, and promoting risk management practices. Founded in 1996 and headquartered in Jersey City, New Jersey, it has additional offices in London, Washington, D.C., Beijing, and Hong Kong. GARP offers several foundational and certificate programs, the best known of which is the Financial Risk Manager (FRM) certification.

GARP also runs initiatives such as the GARP Risk Institute (GRI) and GARP Benchmarking Initiative (GBI) for research and thought leadership efforts within the risk purview.

== History ==
GARP was founded in 1996 by Marc Lore and Lev Borodovsky, two risk managers. They had been meeting once a week at a New York pub to talk about their chosen field with other risk colleagues and decided that a more formal organization would benefit other risk professionals. About six months later, they had 250 members from 23 countries. Before long, local chapters from around the world had been established by regional directors, offering programs for local members.

In 1997, a year after founding GARP, Lore and Borodovsky introduced the Financial Risk Manager (FRM) certification.

According to GARP, as of 2021, it has 279,000 members in more than 195 countries and regions.

In the early 2000s GARP published GARP Risk Review distributed by subscription to members six times a year.

GARP has not released an annual report since 2021.

== Financial Risk Manager (FRM) ==
The Financial Risk Manager (FRM) is one of the flagship certifications for financial risk professionals, along with the PRM offered by the Professional Risk Managers' International Association. FRMs possess specialized knowledge in assessing and managing risk, and typically work for major banks, insurance companies, accounting firms, regulatory agencies, and asset management firms. Certificants are in more than 190 countries and territories worldwide, and have taken an average of two years to earn their Certification.

Candidates must pass two FRM exams and attain 2 years of relevant practical work experiences prior to being certified. The curriculum incorporates the major strategic disciplines of risk management – market risk, credit risk, operational risk, and investment management – with requisite underlying knowledge. The exams:

1. The tools used to assess financial risk: Foundations of Risk Management; Quantitative Analysis; Financial Markets and Products; Valuation and Risk Models.
2. Application: Market Risk Measurement and Management; Credit Risk Measurement and Management; Operational- and Integrated Risk Management; Risk Management and Investment Management; Current Issues in Financial Markets.

The FRM curriculum is incorporated into several "partner university" programs and syllabi. According to a January 2023 Press Release, there are 77,000 FRMs around the world.

== Other certificate programs ==
GARP offers three role-based risk certifications – the Financial Risk Manager (FRM), the Sustainability and Climate Risk (SCR) certification, and the Risk and AI (RAI) certificate.

It also offers two foundational courses in risk management with its Foundations of Financial Risk and Financial Risk and Regulation programs. The Energy Risk Professional (ERP) certification was officially discontinued in 2021 due to transitions in the energy marketplace.

Additional to these, it provides on-going education through its Continuing Professional Development programming.

== See also ==
- Professional Risk Managers' International Association
- Financial risk management
- Institute of Risk Management
- Professional certification
- Risk and Insurance Management Society
- American Risk and Insurance Association
- Association of Insurance and Risk Managers in Industry and Commerce
