= Certificate in Investment Performance Measurement =

Professional accreditation in the field of investment performance analysis

The Certificate in Investment Performance Measurement (CIPM) is a professional accreditation in the field of investment performance analysis. It includes investment performance measurement and attribution. It is offered by the CIPM Association, a body associated with the CFA Institute.

== Professional accreditation ==
Historically, global investment firms have been subject to a diverse patchwork of laws, regulations, and market customs that dictate how investment performance results can be measured and advertised. For example, the well-known warning that "past investment returns may not be predictive of future investment returns", has long been encouraged in advertisements for managed funds by regulators such as the U.S. Securities and Exchange Commission (SEC).

Recognising that there was likely to be continuous growth in the worldwide patchwork of regulations covering investment return calculations and advertising, the global investment management industry agreed on a set of standards known as the Global Investment Performance Standards (GIPS).

The GIPS standards relate to the following issues:

Because GIPS is a professional body of knowledge, it became clear that there should be a proper accreditation for professionals in this field. This led the CFA Institute to form the CIPM Association.

Candidates for the CIPM qualification must adhere to the same body of professional ethics and professional conduct that has been devised for Chartered Financial Analysts by the CFA Institute. To obtain the Certificate, one must sequentially pass two examinations (known respectively as Principles and Expert). The content of each of these examinations includes 13% on ethics and professional standards. A certain level of practical experience is also required before obtaining the certificate. After obtaining the Certificate, Certificate-holders are required to engage in continuing education, and to file a Professional Conduct Statement (PCS) annually. Misconduct can render a certificate-holder liable to professional discipline.

== Trademarks ==
GIPS, CFA, and CIPM are registered trademarks of the CFA Institute.

== Historical pass rates ==
Year	Level 1 (formerly “Principles”, Mar/Sep)	Level 2 (formerly “Expert”, Mar/Sep)
2026	31%/TBD	44%/TBD
2025	40%/34%	36%/52%
2024	30%/35%	34%/52%
2023	27%/42%	34%/50%
2022	42%/42%	34%/44%
2021	45%/34%	43%/29%
2020	59% (Nov)	59% (Nov)
2019	49%/48%	54%/51%
2018	47%/46%	60%/57%
2017	43%/46%	59%/59%
2016	55%/42%	54%/52%
2015	56%/54%	56%/54%
2014	54%/60%	53%/52%
2013	53%/--%	50%/--%
2012	--%/--%	--%/--%
2011	--%/--%	--%/--%
2010	--%/--%	--%/--%
2009	--%/--%	--%/45%
2008	--%/--%	--%/41%
2007	--%/49%	--%/--%
