= CFA Institute =

Association for finance and investment professionals

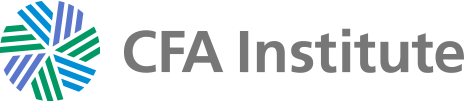
- Formation: 1947
- Type: Non-profit
- Purpose: Finance education
- Headquarters: Charlottesville, Virginia, United States
- Coordinates: 38°1′55.64″N 78°28′18.1″W
- Region served: Worldwide
- Members: 213,700 (2025)
- Official language: English
- Board Chair: Marshall Bailey
- President & CEO: Margaret Franklin
- Main organ: Financial Analysts Journal
- Revenue: ▲US$415.7 million (2025)
- Expenses: ▲US$325.8 million (2025)
- Staff: 593 (2025)
- Website: www.cfainstitute.org
- Formerly called: Association for Investment Management and Research (AIMR)

CFA Institute is an American, not-for-profit professional organization that provides finance education to investment professionals. CFA Institute aims to promote standards in ethics, education, and professional excellence in the global investment services industry. Since 1945, CFA Institute has published the peer-reviewed, quarterly journal, the Financial Analysts Journal. CFA Institute also publishes the Enterprising Investor blog.

== Structure ==
CFA Institute currently offers two credentials and seven certificates. The CFA designation remains its flagship designation program:

=== Credentials ===
- Chartered Financial Analyst (CFA)
- Certificate in Investment Performance Measurement (CIPM)

=== Certificates ===
- Private Markets and Alternative Investments Certificate
- Private Equity Certificate
- Advanced Private Equity Certificate
- Investment Foundations Certificate
- Sustainable Investing Certificate (Formerly Certificate in ESG Investing)
- Climate Risk, Valuation, and Investing Certificate
- Principles of Sustainable Investing (in Simplified Chinese)

It provides continuing education conferences, seminars, webcasts, and publications to allow members and other participants to stay current on developments in the investment industry. CFA Institute also oversees the CFA Institute Research Challenge for university students and the CFA Institute Research Foundation.

CFA Institute is headquartered in Charlottesville, Virginia, with additional offices in New York City, Washington, D.C., London, Hong Kong, Mumbai, Beijing, Shanghai and Abu Dhabi. The current President and CEO is Margaret Franklin.

== History ==
Historical logo

In 1947, four financial analyst societies—Boston, Chicago, New York, and Philadelphia — cooperated for the purpose of promoting the exchange of ideas and supporting the welfare of their profession, calling the new group the National Federation of Financial Analysts Societies (NFFAS). In 1959, the NFFAS Board of Directors approved the establishment of the Institute of Chartered Financial Analysts (ICFA), which was incorporated in 1962. NFFAS changed its name to the Financial Analysts Federation (FAF) in 1961.

In 1962, the Chartered Financial Analyst (CFA) designation and code of conduct were established. In 1963, the profession was formalized when 284 candidates sat for the first CFA exam and 268 CFA charters were awarded. The following year, all 3 levels of the exam were administered to more than 1,700 candidates.

The Association for Investment Management and Research (AIMR) was founded in 1990 as the umbrella organization for the ICFA and the FAF, still separate entities at that time. ICFA and the FAF consolidated under AIMR in 1999.

In 2004, the Association for Investment Management and Research voted to change its name to CFA Institute.

In February 2019, The United States Department of Justice announced it will fine CFA Institute more than $320,000 for discriminating against qualified American workers by hiring temporary foreign workers through the H-1B visa program.

During the COVID-19 pandemic, CFA Institute cancelled the majority of the 2020 examinations around the world due to the lack of examination facilities. From 2021 onwards, all examinations were shifted to computer-based testing for the three levels of the CFA program.

In March 2021, CFA Institute launched the Certificate in ESG Investing due to the high profile of environmental, social and corporate governance (ESG) factors in socially responsible investing.

== Year in summary ==
Members and Exam Administrations	FY2025	FY2024	FY2023	FY2022	FY2021	FY2020	FY2019
CFA Institute Members	213,700	211,200	206,000	202,200	191,000	186,400	178,400
CFA Program Administrations	200,000	208,300	211,100	262,400	214,900	102,200	354,300
CIPM Program Administrations	900	900	800	900	1,500	950	1,600
Sustainable Investing Certificate Registrations	12,200	20,500	17,000	3,100	N/A	N/A	N/A

== Controversies ==
In 2019, CFA Institute settled with the US DOJ for violating H1B Visa rules when it failed to consider equally qualified US workers for the positions relating to correcting exams. CFA Institute changed their prior policy of paying exam graders as a consequence of the settlement.

In June 2025, the Manhattan District Attorney announced that they had indicted Michael Collins for embezzling nearly six million from two companies, one being CFA Institute. Michael Collins was appointed managing director of CFA Institute in 2016.
