= Chief financial officer =

Person in a company or organization responsible for finances

A chief financial officer (CFO) is an officer of a company or organization who is assigned the primary responsibility for making decisions for the company for projects and its finances; i.a.: financial planning, management of financial risks, record-keeping, and financial reporting, and, increasingly, the analysis of data. The CFO thus has ultimate authority over the finance unit and is the chief financial spokesperson for the organization.

The CFO typically reports to the chief executive officer (CEO) and the board of directors and may additionally have a seat on the board. The CFO directly assists the chief operating officer (COO) on all business matters relating to budget management, cost–benefit analysis, forecasting needs, and securing of new funding. Some CFOs have the title CFOO for chief financial and operating officer. In most countries, finance directors (FD) typically report into the CFO, and FD is the level before reaching CFO.

== Role ==
The CFO serves as the financial authority in the organization, with ultimate responsibility for the day-to-day aspects of financial management, ensuring an operating environment that values cash flow, profit margins, and risk mitigation; tax management (and optimization) will be a parallel focus. The CFO thus has oversight of risk-, investment- and treasury management: the Chief Risk Officer, Chief Investment Officer and Treasurer will report to the CFO (or in smaller firms, the CFO absorbs these roles). CFOs, in some organizations, will appoint a Chief Procurement Officer.

The CFO, perhaps more importantly, also drives the company's long-term financial strategy. Here, they will be critically involved in determining the viability and (see below) direction of major capital investments. This extends, as relevant, to e.g. mergers and acquisitions, and to corporate actions more generally. Corresponding to these, the CFO is responsible for managing the company's capital structure; this entails identifying and maintaining the appropriate mix of equity and debt financing, as necessary raising capital via an equity or bond offering. This latter will include negotiating with investors, banks, credit rating agencies, and other financial institutions. See Strategic financial management, Capital budgeting, Corporate finance § Investment banking, Bond credit rating.

A major responsibility is financial reporting, and its related compliance (although many CFOs still spend much of their time in traditional accounting tasks such as transaction reporting). Included here — for listed companies — will be the various mandated security filings and shareholder reports. Typically, then, the CFO is expected to be a key player in stockholder education and communication. The Comptroller, Company Secretary, and Investor Relations Officer will also report to the CFO.

CFOs are thus relied upon as the owners of financial data within organizations; increasingly, this includes business data more generally. In this role, then — as outlined above — the CFO's responsibilities extend to decision support, enabling the company to operate more effectively and efficiently; and relatedly, ensuring data integrity, and model transparency and accountability. The CFO and Chief Information Officer must therefore closely collaborate, sometimes sharing KPIs.

This focus on data analytics to support decision-making (along with the rise of digital technologies) places pressure on CFOs to meet the expectations of their C-Suite colleagues. Here, many organizations have created a Finance function based on four pillars:

1. the accounting organization as a shared service
2. an FP&A organization responsible for driving financial planning processes as well as increased insight into financial and non financial KPIs to boost business performance
3. a finance business partnering organization based on leadership of divisions, regions and performance improvement
4. expertise centers specializing in Tax, Treasury, Internal Audit, Investor Relations, etc.

The CFO was traditionally viewed as a financial "gatekeeper". Over time - as outlined - the position has become one of an advisor and strategic partner to the CEO. According to one source, "The CFO of tomorrow should be a big-picture thinker, rather than detail-oriented, outspoken rather than reserved, prefer to delegate rather than be hands-on, emphasize what gets done rather than how things are done, and make collaborative rather than unilateral decisions". The duties of a modern CFO, therefore, now straddle the traditional areas of financial stewardship, as well as the more progressive areas of strategic- and business leadership, with increasingly direct responsibility and oversight of operations. The relationship with the COO mirrors that with the CIO as above.

This significant role-based transformation is best-evidenced by the "CEO-in-Waiting" status that many CFOs now hold. Here, CEOs increasingly expect their CFOs to be active participants in shaping the strategy of their organizations, including challenging the current strategy. CFOs thus play a critical role in shaping their company's strategies, functioning as a leader and team builder who sets the financial agenda for the organization, supports the CEO directly and provides timely advice to the board of directors. This is especially so in uncertain macroeconomic environments, where managing financial volatilities is a centerpiece for many companies' strategies. Indeed, the 1990s saw the rise of the strategic CFO, and many companies have created a chief strategy officer (CSO) position.

The CFO is then as much a part of governance and oversight as the CEO, playing a fundamental role in the development and critique of strategic choices. Due to their importance, CFO departures—whether due to retirement, dismissal, or new opportunities—can significantly affect a company’s direction and stability, especially given the CFO’s growing role as a strategic partner to the CEO.

== Legal requirement ==
The appointment of a CFO or FD may be mandated by law. For example, in India, per the provisions of Section 203 of Companies Act 2013 every publicly listed firm having a paid up share capital of Rs. 10 Crores, requires a full time CFO. In the government sector this may be specified also: The US Chief Financial Officers Act, enacted in 1990, created a CFO in each of 23 federal agencies. (See also Office of Management and Budget and Office of Federal Financial Management.)

== Qualifications ==
CFOs and FDs often hold a professional accounting qualification - the CPA, CA, CMA, or CIMA - along with its requisite bachelors and/or masters in accounting. The certification is specified given that major responsibilities include tax and financial reporting. Similarly, financial managers are often qualified accountants.

Often in larger companies, CFOs and FDs may hold additional postgraduate qualifications, such as a Master of Business Administration, or Master of Science in Finance; the Chartered Financial Analyst is also common. These complement the accounting perspective with more general strategic, leadership and financial market considerations, and give exposure to broader financial and operational issues.

== See also ==
- Comptroller
- Treasurer
- Virtual CFO
- Financial manager
