= Treasury services =

Treasury services is a function of an investment bank which provides transaction, investment, and information services for chief financial officers or treasurers and other customers. Treasury services concentrates and invests client money, and provides trade finance and logistics solutions as well as safeguards, values, clears and services securities and portfolios for investors and broker-dealers. Treasury Services is a transaction intensive and system intensive business. This is a source of risk free fee income for the bank.

The key offerings under Treasury Services include:

1. Accounts Receivable service: Helping the client with products and solutions for receiving/collecting money for business deals/sales/service provided from its business partners, clients and large set of retail customers, more quickly and effectively. Example outstanding bills and invoices.
2. Accounts Payable services: Helping the client with products and solutions for making payments to its business partners, clients and retail customers.
3. Liquidity Management services: Helping the CFO of a company to manage short term assets and liabilities and have the optimum amount of working capital, e.g. moving funds between different global accounts held by the client and investing excess cash to earn income, cash forecasting tools etc.
4. Reporting Services: Under this the service provider helps the client consolidate its receivables and payable positions across the countries of operation, across various currencies and reports a net payable/receivable position in each currency. This is very useful in making business decisions on FX and capital management. Rather than purchasing the required currency in small bits and pieces across the globe, the treasury can negotiate better rates for a consolidated open position.
5. Trade Finance Services: Helping the client trade across borders and ensure the delivery and timely collection of payments, e.g. letters of credit and document collection services.

== See also ==
- Cash management
- Treasury management
- Treasury management system
