= Financial management =

Management of money in such a manner as to accomplish the objectives of organization

Financial management is the business function concerned with profitability, expenses, cash, and credit. These are often grouped together under the rubric of maximizing the value of the firm for stockholders. The discipline is then tasked with the "efficient acquisition and deployment" of both short- and long-term financial resources, to ensure the objectives of the enterprise are achieved.

Financial managers (FM) are specialized professionals directly reporting to senior management, often the financial director (FD); the function is seen as 'staff', and not 'line'.

== Role ==
Financial management is generally concerned with short term working capital management, focusing on current assets and current liabilities, and managing fluctuations in foreign currency and product cycles, often through hedging. The function also entails the efficient and effective day-to-day management of funds, and thus overlaps treasury management. It is also involved with long term strategic financial management, focused on i.a. capital structure management, including capital raising, capital budgeting (capital allocation between business units or products), and dividend policy; these latter, in large corporates, being more the domain of "corporate finance."

Specific tasks:

- Profit maximization happens when marginal cost is equal to marginal revenue. This is the main objective of financial management.
- Maintaining proper cash flow is a short run objective of financial management. It is necessary for operations to pay the day-to-day expenses e.g. raw material, electricity bills, wages, rent etc. A good cash flow ensures the survival of company; see cashflow forecast.
- Minimization on capital cost in financial management can help operations gain more profit.
- Estimating the requirement of funds: Businesses make forecast on funds needed in both short run and long run, hence, they can improve the efficiency of funding. The estimation is based on the budget e.g. sales budget, production budget; see budget analyst.
- Determining the capital structure: Capital structure is how a firm finances its overall operations and growth by using different sources of funds. Once the requirement of funds has been estimated, the financial manager should decide the mix of debt and equity, as well as the types of debt.

== Relationship with other areas of finance ==
Two areas of finance directly overlap financial management: (i) Managerial finance is the (academic) branch of finance concerned with the managerial application of financial techniques; (ii) Corporate finance is mainly concerned with the longer term capital budgeting, and typically is more relevant to large corporations.

Investment management, also related, is the professional asset management of various securities (shares, bonds and other securities/assets). In the context of financial management, the function sits with treasury; usually the management of the various short-term financial legal instruments (contractual duties, obligations, or rights) appropriate to the company's cash- and liquidity management requirements. See Treasury management § Cash and liquidity management and Chief Investment Officer.

The term "financial management" refers to a company's financial strategy, while personal finance or financial life management refers to an individual's management strategy. A financial planner, or personal financial planner, is a professional who prepares financial plans.

== Financial management systems ==
Financial management systems are the software and technology used by organizations to connect, store, and report on assets, income, and expenses. These provide the modeling, collaboration and workflow capabilities that spreadsheets cannot sustain at scale. Here, financial managers and CFOs rely on a range of products: traditionally, commercial EPM and BI tools such as BusinessObjects (SAP), OBI EE (Oracle), Cognos (IBM), and Power BI (Microsoft); and increasingly, specialised FP&A products provided by Jedox, Anaplan, Workday, Hyperion, Wolters Kluwer, Datarails, and Workiva. Note that - despite the issues outlined - spreadsheets remain in wide use, invariably as a starting point, and frequently in total. (Additionally, the above products - along with company data - are often accessed via a spreadsheet add-in.)

== See also ==
- Financial management for IT services, financial management of IT assets and resources
- Financial Management Service, a bureau of the U.S. Treasury which provides financial services for the government.
- Financial mismanagement
- Financial risk management § Corporate finance
- FP&A
- Managerial finance
