= Treasury management =

Management of an enterprise's holdings and liquidity to mitigate risk

Treasury management (or treasury operations) entails management of an enterprise's financial holdings, focusing on the firm's liquidity, and mitigating its financial, operational and reputational risk. Treasury management's scope thus includes the firm's collections, disbursements, concentration, investment and funding activities.

In corporates, treasury overlaps the financial management function, although the former has the more specific focus mentioned, while the latter is a broader field that includes financial planning, budgeting, and analysis. In banks, the function plays a slightly different, more integral role, managing also the link between the institution and the stakeholders. In both, there is a close relationship with the financial risk management area.

A company's treasury operation, typically, is under control of the CFO or vice-president and director of finance; and in larger entities is under a dedicated treasurer. Operations are handled on a day-to-day basis by the organization's treasury staff, controller, or comptroller.

== Corporates ==
For non-banking entities, the terms Treasury Management and Cash Management are sometimes used interchangeably, while, in fact, the scope of treasury management is larger, and encompasses funding and investment activities, as mentioned above. The significant core functions of a corporate treasury department include:

=== Cash and liquidity management ===
Cash- and liquidity management is often described as treasury's 'primary duty.' Essentially, a company needs to be able to meet its financial obligations as they fall due, i.e. to pay employees, suppliers, lenders and shareholders. This can also be described as the need to maintain liquidity, or solvency of the company: a company needs to have the funds available that will enable it to stay in business. In addition to dealing with payment transactions; cash management also includes planning, account organisation, cash flow monitoring, managing bank accounts, electronic banking, pooling and netting as well as the functions of in-house banks.

=== Risk management ===
The aim of risk management is, generally, to identify, measure, and manage risks that could have a significant impact on the business' goals. In this context, the focus is twofold, ensuring that the company can meet its financial obligations, and ensuring predictable business performance. Treasurers are then tasked, more specifically, with managing:

- Liquidity risk: the company is unable to fund itself or is unable to meet its obligations; overlapping the above
- Market risk: changes in market prices (typically foreign exchange, interest rates, commodities) cause losses to the business
- Credit risk: that a counterparty default causes loss to the business.

Operational risk - losses to the business due to fraud or error - will sometimes fall under Treasury, although as these risks are not directly financial in nature, they are often delegated to a dedicated team. In many sales- or lending-oriented businesses, credit risk is likewise not in direct scope. Re both, however, Treasury, will exercise some oversight.

=== Corporate Finance ===
Looking after contacts with banks and rating agencies, as well as discussions with credit insurers and, if applicable, suppliers concerning periods allowed for payment, in conjunction with the procurement of finance, also form part of the treasurer's core business. See Treasurer § Corporate treasurers and Cash flow forecasting § Corporate finance.

== Banks ==
The treasury function is, as outlined, integral to banking institutions. Its role arises, essentially, in that the bank receives funding (its liabilities) through customer deposits and issuing senior unsecured debt, often bonds, in the wholesale market, and in turn deploys these funds to its various profit generating businesses (assets). Treasury is then responsible for managing financial assets and liabilities, ensuring sufficient liquidity, and "capitalizing on market opportunities" to maximize profitability.

Most large banks thus maintain dedicated Treasury Management departments. These will, in turn, operate the following bank dealing areas or treasury management client service desks:

- A fixed income or money market desk that is devoted to buying and selling interest bearing securities.
- A foreign exchange desk that exchanges currencies as a service to the clients.
- A capital markets or equities desk that deals in shares listed on the stock market.

Critically, Treasury maintains, also, an asset liability management (ALM) desk that manages any potential interest rate mismatch — in the specific context outlined — as well as liquidity risk more generally. Here, Treasury is responsible for the key funds transfer pricing (FTP) function, that prices liquidity for business lines within the bank; i.e., where funds that go toward lending products (asset sales teams) are charged a term and risk-appropriate rate, whereas funds generated by deposits (and related) are credited similarly. (See similar re "risk pooling".)

Relatedly, the bank’s treasury is usually integrally involved in balance sheet management more generally, suggesting which currencies and terms are favorable from a funding perspective and which assets are required to meet various regulatory targets. Re the latter, treasury is tasked with monitoring regulatory capital under Basel III: more especially the capital adequacy-, leverage-, and liquidity coverage ratios, as well as the bank's total loss absorbing capacity. At commercial and retail banks, Treasury will be concerned, further, with their reserve requirement and with interest rate risk in the banking book.

Bank Treasuries will often also support their clients' needs in the above areas, through Treasury Management "services" or "products"; depending on the arrangement, they may or may not disclose the prices charged here. Note that a number of independent treasury management systems (TMS) are available, allowing enterprises to conduct treasury management internally.

Smaller banks are increasingly launching and/or expanding their treasury management functions and offerings. This is due to: an increased "focus" by banks (after the 2008 financial crisis) on the clients they serve best; the availability of seasoned treasury management professionals; access to industry standard, third-party technology providers' products and services - tiered according to the needs of these (smaller) clients; and similar access to best practices and staff-training.

== See also ==
- Cash management
- Financial management
- Financial risk management
- Liquidity risk § Management
- Treasurer § Corporate treasurers
- Treasury management system
- Treasury services (IB product offering)
- Certifications:
  - Association of Corporate Treasurers
  - Certified Treasury Professional
