= FP&A =

Accounting and business support structure

FP&A tasks and activities
- Business analytics
- Capital budgeting
- Cash flow forecasting
- Corporate budgeting
- Decision support
- Financial analysis
- Financial forecasting
- Financial modeling
- Financial planning
- Predictive analytics
- Risk management
- Scenario analytics
- Working capital management

Financial planning and analysis (FP&A), in accounting and business, refers to the various integrated planning, analysis, and modeling activities aimed at supporting financial decisioning and management in the wider organization. See Financial analyst § Financial planning and analysis for outline, and aside articles for further detail. In larger companies, "FP&A" will run as a dedicated area or team, under an "FP&A Manager" reporting to the CFO.

FP&A is distinct from financial management and (management) accounting in that it is oriented, additionally, towards business performance management, and, further, encompasses both qualitative and quantitative analysis. This positioning allows management—in partnership with FP&A—to preemptively address issues relating, e.g., to customers and operations, as well as the more traditional business-finance problems. Relatedly, although Budgeting and Forecasting are typically done at specific times in the year—and correspondingly cover specific time periods—FP&A, by contrast, has a wider brief re both horizon and content. "FP&A Analysts" thus play an important role in every (major) decision by the company—ranging in scope from changes in headcount to mergers and acquisitions.

Over the years, FP&A's role has evolved, facilitated by technological advances. During its early years, 1960s to 1980s, FP&A focused on more traditional forecasting and financial analysis; relying on spreadsheets, mainly Excel, but in earlier years, Lotus 1-2-3 (and VisiCalc). From the 1980s to the early 2000s, the scope shifted to risk, scenario, and sensitivity analysis; utilizing commercial business intelligence and financial modeling software. From 2000s to present, the emphasis has shifted to predictive analytics; tools include cloud-based platforms and analytics packages, and specialized FP&A software, all increasingly employing AI / ML.

== See also ==
- FP&A Professional (FPAC)
- Corporate finance analyst
- Strategic financial management
- Chief financial officer § Role
- Financial management § Role
- Management accounting § Role within a corporation
