= Neil Garrod =

British academic

Neil W. Garrod is a British academic who has published in the fields of mathematical programming, accounting, financial analysis and higher education policy (Challenging Boundaries, 2010).

He graduated from the University of Manchester Institute of Science and Technology (UMIST) with a B.Sc. in Management Sciences and a Ph.D. In Operations Research. He has held lecturing posts in the University of Wales, Aberystwyth; Union College, Schenectady, New York; University of Wales, Bangor; University of Glasgow, Scotland.

He was Dean of the Faculty of Law and Financial Studies at the University of Glasgow before taking the position of Executive Dean of the Faculty of Commerce, Law and Management at the University of the Witwatersrand in Johannesburg, South Africa. He has held Deputy Vice-Chancellor positions at Thames Valley University and the University of Greenwich as well as Executive Director of Enterprise and Civic Engagement at Glyndwr University and was Director of the Higher Colleges of Technology (HCT) in Al Ain in the United Arab Emirates. He is currently Deputy Vice-Chancellor at the Central University of Technology, Bloemfontein, South Africa.

== Run ==
In 2001 he ran from Rome to Glasgow as part of the celebrations of the 550th anniversary of the establishment of the University of Glasgow by papal bull. He ran for 64 consecutive days averaging a marathon a day.
