= Chartered Institute of Professional Financial Managers =

American professional body

- Abbreviation: CIPFM
- Type: Private
- Purpose: Educating and certifying financial managers worldwide
- Headquarters: 501 Silverside Rd Ste 105
- Location: Wilmington, Delaware, United States
- Region served: Worldwide
- Website: www.cipfmglobalonline.org

The Chartered Institute of Professional Financial Managers (CIPFM) is an American professional body for financial management situated in Wilmington, Delaware. Member of Central Delaware Chamber of Commerce (CDCC) in Dover, CIPFM has a vision to educate and certify financial managers in United States and worldwide.

== Affiliations ==
The CIPFM has affiliations and representatives in some countries promoting its courses and membership. It also has reciprocal membership with some professional organizations with similar goals and mission.

== Certifications ==
The Institute offer courses leading to the award of the Chartered Financial Manager (CFM) and the Chartered Fraud Controller (CFC) designations among other courses. The institute's courses are also being offered by colleges oversees.

== Membership awards ==
The CIPFM offers three categories of membership which include:

- Associate Chartered Financial Manager (ACFM)
- Fellow Chartered Financial Manager (FCFM)
- Hon Fellow ( HonFCFM)
