= Finance =

Academic discipline studying businesses and investments

Finance refers to the management, movement, investment, and raising of money. "Finance" also refers to the academic discipline that studies these. Based on the scope of financial activities, the discipline can be divided into the three primary branches personal, corporate, and public finance. (Note: The following are definitions of 'finance' offered by the authors indicated: Fama and Miller: "The theory of finance is concerned with how individuals and firms allocate resources through time. In particular, it seeks to explain how solutions to the problems faced in allocating resources through time are facilitated by the existence of capital markets (which provide a means for individual economic agents to exchange resources to be available of different points In time) and of firms (which, by their production-investment decisions, provide a means for individuals to transform current resources physically into resources to be available in the future)."; Guthmann and Dougall: "Finance is concerned with the raising and administering of funds and with the relationships between private profit-seeking enterprise on the one hand and the groups which supply the funds on the other. These groups, which include investors and speculators – that is, capitalists or property owners – as well as those who advance short-term capital, place their money in the field of commerce and industry and in return expect a stream of income."; Drake and Fabozzi: "Finance is the application of economic principles to decision-making that involves the allocation of money under conditions of uncertainty."; F.W. Paish: "Finance may be defined as the position of money at the time it is wanted".; John J. Hampton: "The term finance can be defined as the management of the flows of money through an organisation, whether it will be a corporation, school, or bank or government agency".; Howard and Upton: "Finance may be defined as that administrative area or set of administrative functions in an organisation which relates with the arrangement of each debt and credit so that the organisation may have the means to carry out the objectives as satisfactorily as possible".; Pablo Fernandez: "Finance is a profession that requires interdisciplinary training and helps company managers make sound decisions regarding financing, investment, continuity, and other issues that affect the inflow and outflow of money, as well as the company's risk. It also helps individuals and institutions invest wisely and plan money-related matters effectively.")

In the "financial system", assets are bought, sold, or traded as financial instruments, such as currencies, loans, bonds, shares, stocks, options, futures, swaps, etc. Assets can also be banked, invested, and insured to maximize value and minimize loss. In practice, risks are always present in any financial action and entities. Financial markets and institutions underpin the system.

Due to its wide scope, a broad range of subfields exists within finance. Asset-, money-, risk- and investment management aim to maximize value and minimize volatility. Financial analysis assesses the viability, stability, and profitability of an action or entity. Some fields are multidisciplinary, such as mathematical finance, financial law, financial economics, financial engineering and financial technology. In some cases, theories in finance can be tested using the scientific method, covered by experimental finance.

The early history of finance parallels the early history of money, which is prehistoric. Ancient and medieval civilizations incorporated basic functions of finance, such as banking, trading and accounting, into their economies. In the late 19th century, the global financial system was formed.

As a subject of study, finance is related to the fields of economics (the study of the production, distribution, and consumption of goods and services) and business administration (the management of an organization's resources to achieve its goals). The earliest doctoral programs in finance were established in the 1960s and 1970s. Today, finance is also widely studied through career-focused undergraduate and master's level programs.

== The financial system ==
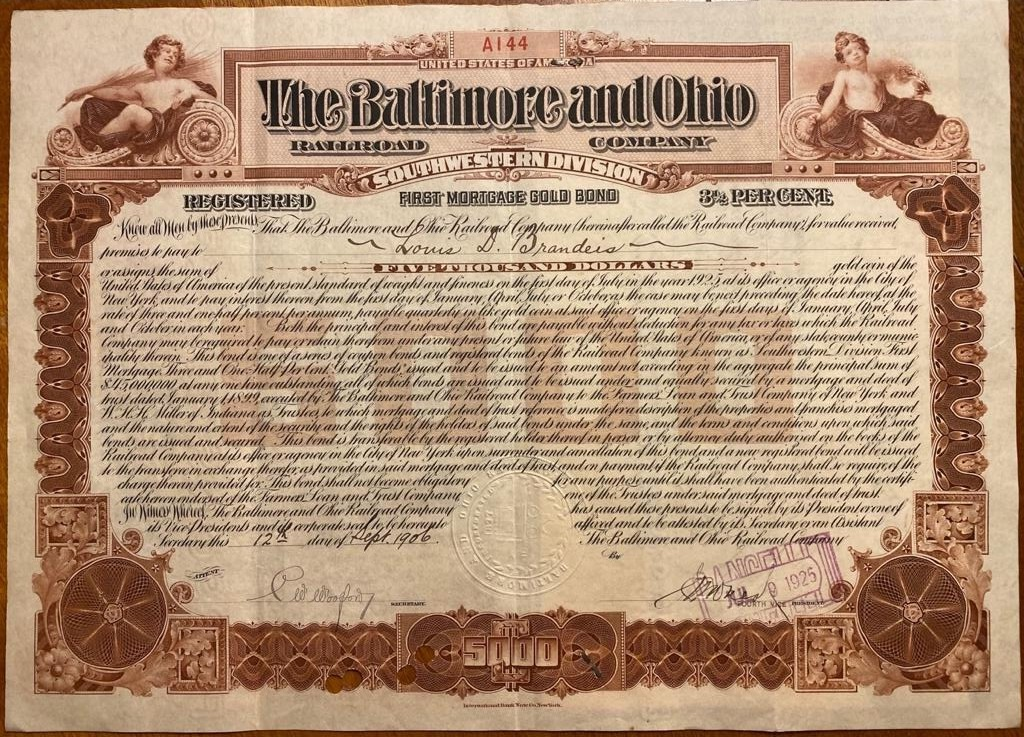
Bond issued by The Baltimore and Ohio Railroad. Bonds are a form of borrowing used by corporations to finance their operations.

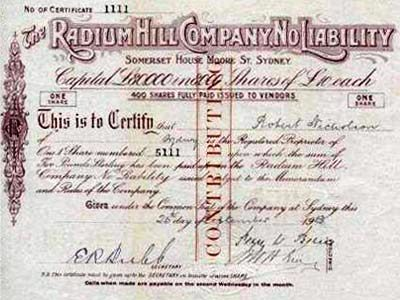
Share certificate dated 1913 issued by the Radium Hill Company

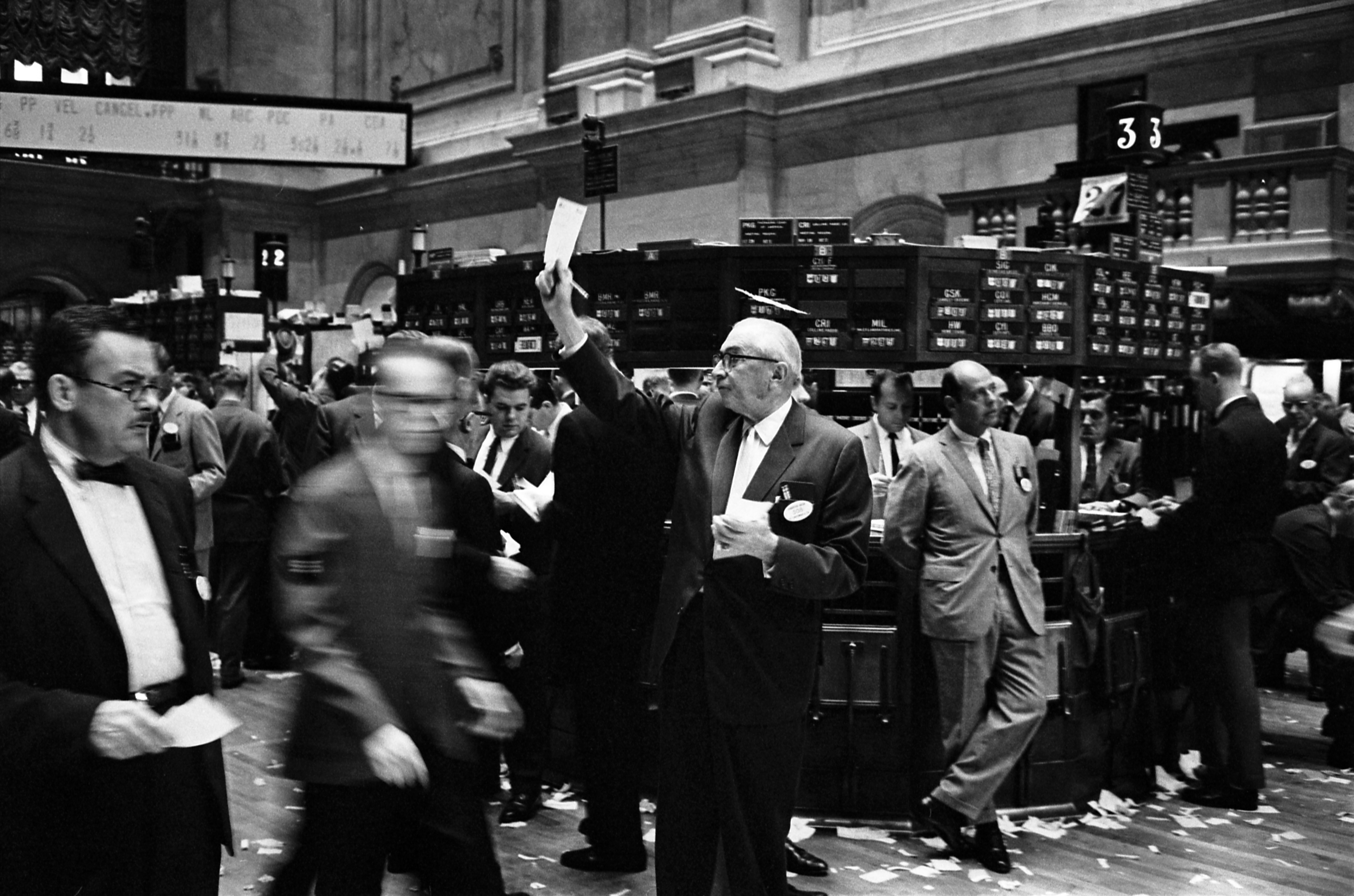
NYSE's stock exchange traders floor in 1963, before the introduction of electronic readouts and computer screens

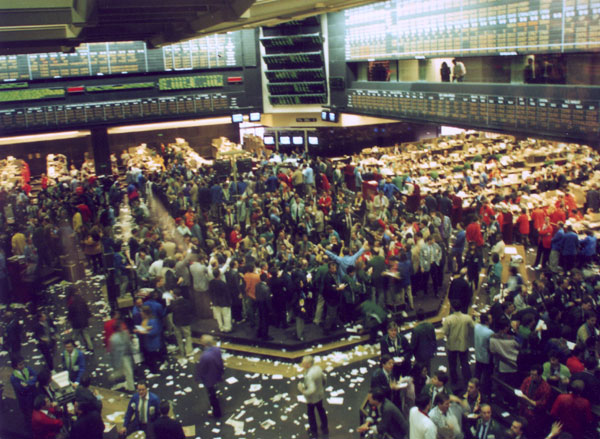
Chicago Board of Trade Corn Futures market, 1993

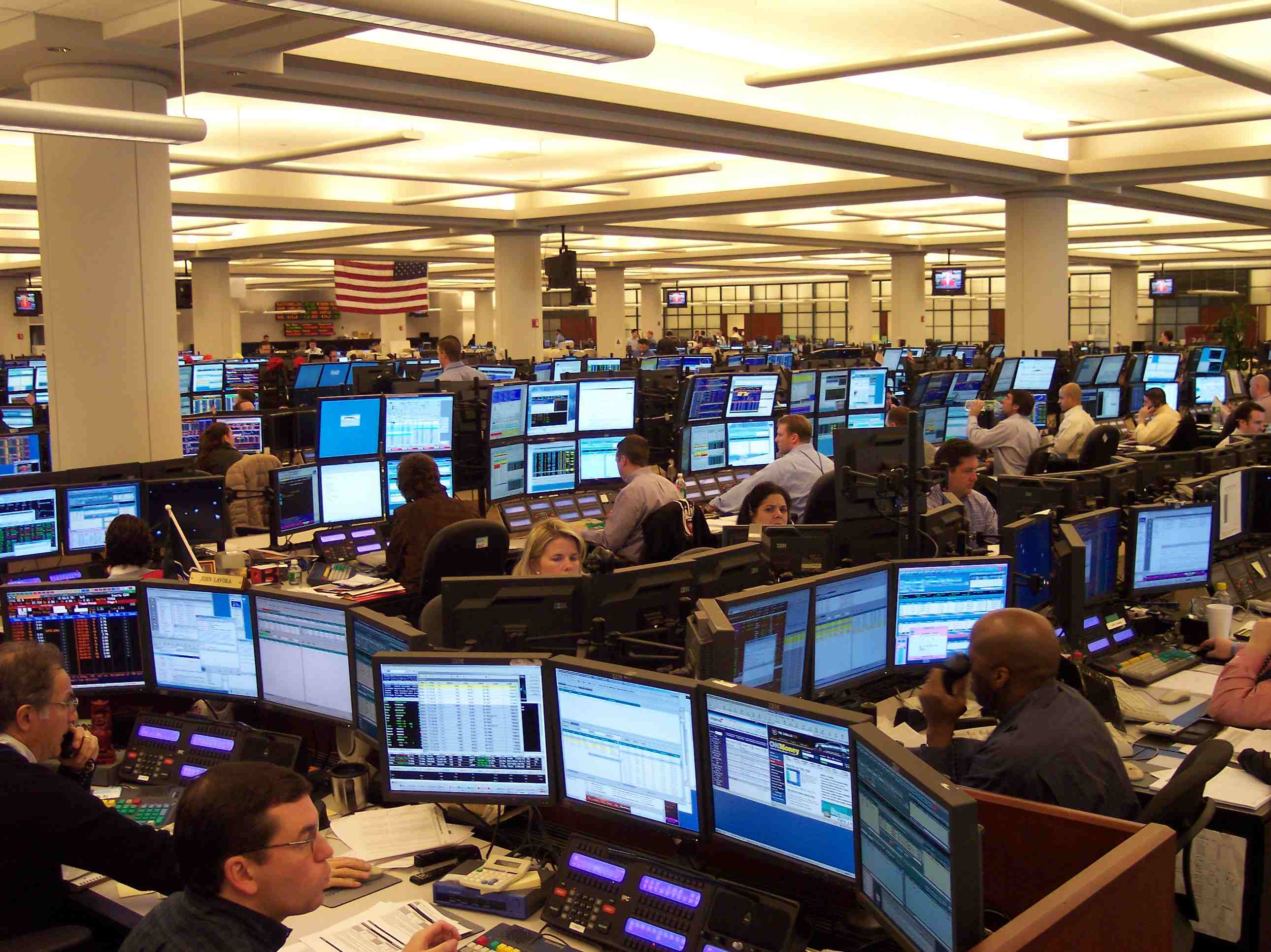
Oil traders, Houston, 2009

As outlined, the financial system consists of the flows of capital that take place between individuals and households (personal finance), governments (public finance), and businesses (corporate finance). "Finance" thus studies the process of channeling money from savers and investors to entities that need it. (Note: Finance thus allows production and consumption in society to operate independently from each other. Without the use of financial allocation, production would have to happen at the same time and space as consumption. Through finance, distances in timespace between production and consumption are then possible.) Savers and investors have money available which could earn interest or dividends if put to productive use. Individuals, companies, and governments must obtain money from an external source, such as loans or credit, when they lack sufficient funds to run their operations.

In general, an entity whose income exceeds its expenditure can lend or invest the surplus with the aim of earning a fair return. Correspondingly, an entity where income is less than expenditure can raise capital usually in one of two ways: (i) by borrowing in the form of a loan (private individuals), or by selling government or corporate bonds; (ii) by a corporation selling equity, also called stock or shares (which may take various forms: preferred stock or common stock). The owners of both bonds and stock may be institutional investors—financial institutions such as investment banks and pension funds—or private individuals, called private investors or retail investors. (See Financial market participants.)

The lending is often indirect, through a financial intermediary such as a bank, or via the purchase of notes or bonds (corporate bonds, government bonds, or mutual bonds) in the bond market. The lender receives interest, the borrower pays a higher interest than the lender receives, and the financial intermediary earns the difference for arranging the loan. A bank aggregates the activities of many borrowers and lenders. Banks accept deposits from individuals and businesses, paying interest on these funds. The bank then lends these deposits to borrowers, facilitating transactions between borrowers and lenders of various sizes and enabling efficient financial coordination. Investing typically entails the purchase of stock, either individual securities or via a mutual fund, for example. Stocks are usually sold by corporations to investors so as to raise required capital in the form of "equity financing", as distinct from the debt financing described above. The financial intermediaries here are the investment banks (which find the initial investors and facilitate the listing of the securities, typically shares and bonds), the securities exchanges (which allow their trade thereafter), and the various investment service providers (including mutual funds, pension funds, wealth managers, and stock brokers, typically servicing retail investors).

Inter-institutional trade and investment, and fund-management at this scale, is referred to as "wholesale finance". Institutions here extend the products offered, with related trading, to include bespoke options, swaps, and structured products, as well as specialized financing; this "financial engineering" is inherently mathematical, and these institutions are then the major employers of quantitative analysts (or "quants", see below). In these institutions, risk management, regulatory capital, and compliance play major roles.

== Areas of finance ==
As outlined, finance broadly comprises three areas: personal finance, corporate finance, and public finance. These, in turn, overlap and employ various activities and sub-disciplines—chiefly investments, risk management, and quantitative finance.

=== Personal finance ===
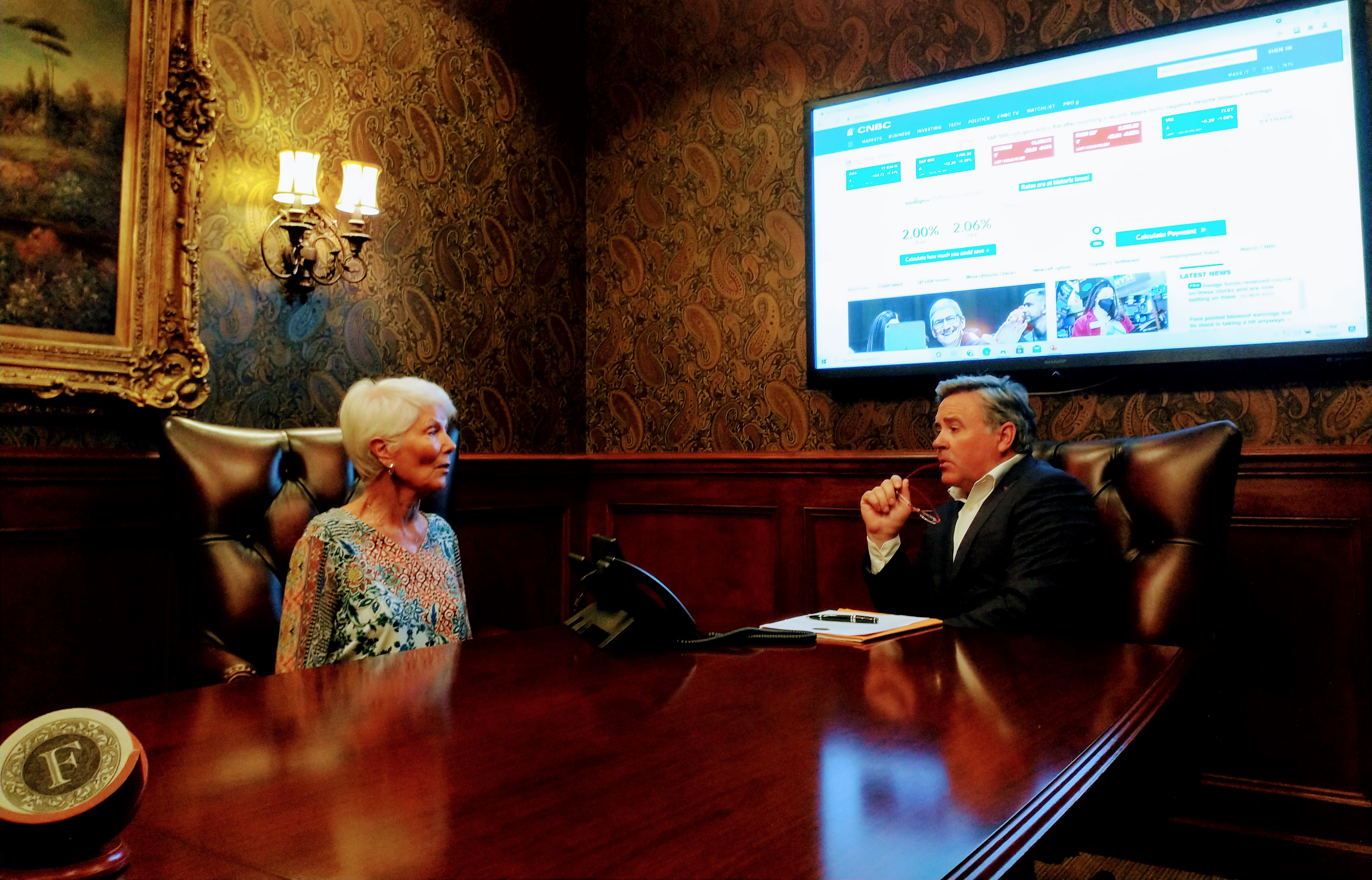
Wealth management consultation—here, the financial advisor counsels the client on an appropriate investment strategy.

Personal finance refers to the practice of budgeting to ensure enough funds are available to meet basic needs, while ensuring there is only a reasonable level of risk to lose said capital. Personal finance may involve paying for education, financing durable goods such as real estate and cars, buying insurance, investing, and saving for retirement. Personal finance may also involve paying for a loan or other debt obligations. The main areas of personal finance are considered to be income, spending, saving, investing, and protection. The following steps, as outlined by the Financial Planning Standards Board, suggest that an individual will understand a potentially secure personal finance plan after:

- Purchasing insurance to ensure protection against unforeseen personal events;
- Understanding the effects of tax policies, subsidies, or penalties on the management of personal finances;
- Understanding the effects of credit on individual financial standing;
- Developing a savings plan or financing for large purchases (auto, education, home);
- Planning a secure financial future in an environment of economic instability;
- Pursuing a checking or a savings account;
- Preparing for retirement or other long term expenses.

=== Corporate finance ===
Corporate finance deals with the actions that managers take to increase the value of the firm to the shareholders, the sources of funding and the capital structure of corporations, and the tools and analysis used to allocate financial resources. While corporate finance is in principle different from managerial finance, which studies the financial management of all firms rather than corporations alone, the concepts are applicable to the financial problems of all firms, and this area is then often referred to as "business finance".

Typically, "corporate finance" relates to the long term objective of maximizing the value of the entity's assets, its stock, and its return to shareholders, while also balancing risk and profitability. This entails three primary areas:

1. Capital budgeting: selecting which projects to invest in—here, accurately determining value is crucial, as judgements about asset values can be "make or break".
2. Dividend policy: the use of "excess" funds—these are to be reinvested in the business or returned to shareholders.
3. Capital structure: deciding on the mix of funding to be used—here attempting to find the optimal capital mix re debt-commitments vs cost of capital. (This consists in understanding how much the firm has to generate to satisfy investors, and by minimizing the weighted average cost of capital (WACC) so that the value of the company increases.)

The latter creates the link with investment banking and securities trading, as above, in that the capital raised will generically comprise debt, i.e. corporate bonds, and equity, often listed shares. Re risk management within corporates, see below.

Financial managers—i.e. as distinct from corporate financiers—focus more on the short term elements of profitability, cash flow, and "working capital management" (inventory, credit and debtors), which is concerned about the daily funding operations, and the goal is to maintain liquidity, minimize risk and maximize efficiency ensuring that the firm can safely and profitably carry out its financial and operational objectives; i.e. that it: (1) can service both maturing short-term debt repayments, and scheduled long-term debt payments, and (2) has sufficient cash flow for ongoing and upcoming operational expenses. (See Financial management and FP&A.)

=== Public finance ===
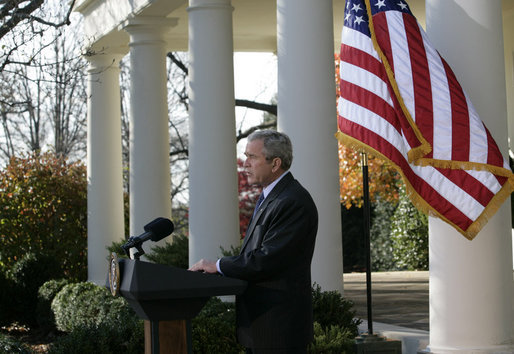
President George W. Bush, speaking on the Federal Budget in 2007, requesting additional funds from Congress

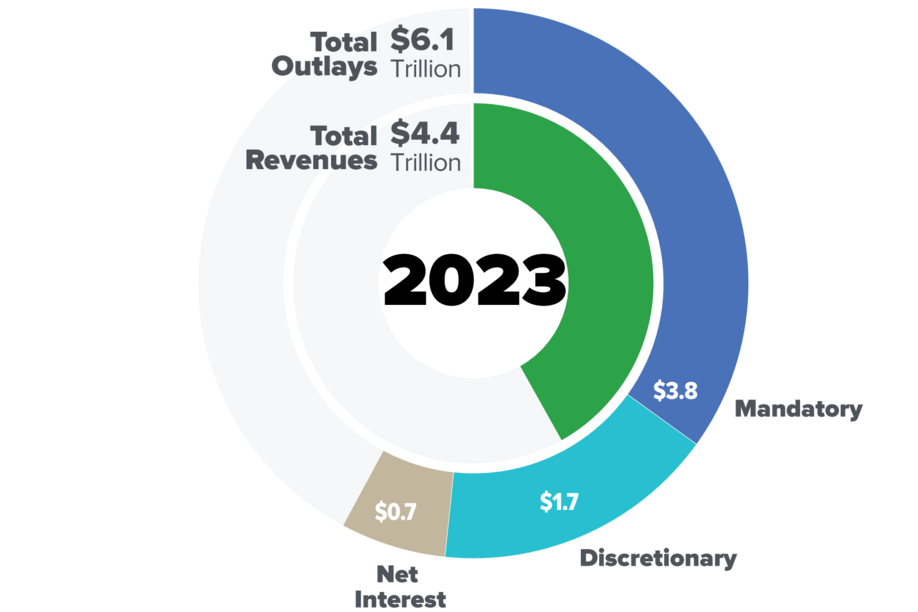
CBO: 2023 US Federal Budget Infographic

Public finance refers to the management of finances related to sovereign states, sub-national entities, and associated public agencies or bodies. It generally encompasses a long-term strategic perspective regarding investment decisions that affect public entities. These long-term strategic periods typically encompass five or more years. Public finance is primarily concerned with:

- Identification of required expenditures of a public sector entity;
- Source(s) of that entity's revenue - both from tax, and from non-tax sources;
- The budgeting process;
- Sovereign debt issuance, or municipal bonds for public works projects.

Central banks, such as the Federal Reserve System banks in the United States, the European Central Bank and the Bank of England in the United Kingdom, are strong players in public finance. They act as lenders of last resort as well as strong influences on monetary and credit conditions in the economy.

Development finance, which is related, concerns investment in economic development projects provided by a (quasi) governmental institution on a non-commercial basis; these projects would otherwise not be able to get financing. A public–private partnership is primarily used for infrastructure projects: a private sector corporate provides the financing up-front, and then draws profits from taxpayers or users. Climate finance, and the related Environmental finance, address the financial strategies, resources and instruments used in climate change mitigation.

=== Investment management ===
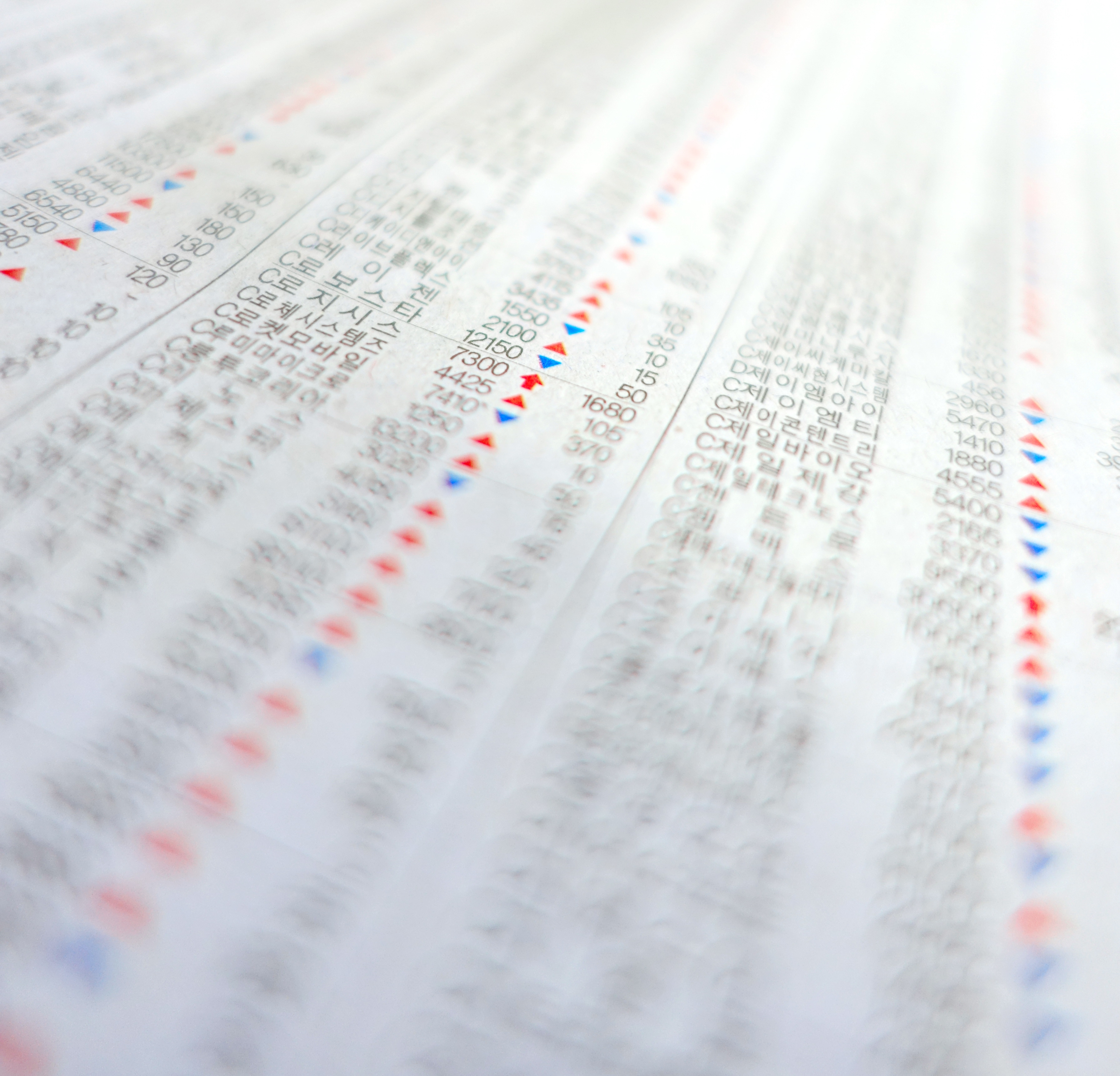
Share prices listed in a Korean newspaper

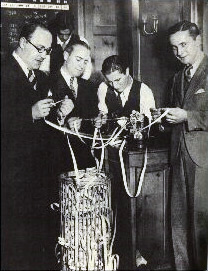
"The excitement before the bubble burst"—viewing prices via ticker tape, shortly before the Wall Street crash of 1929

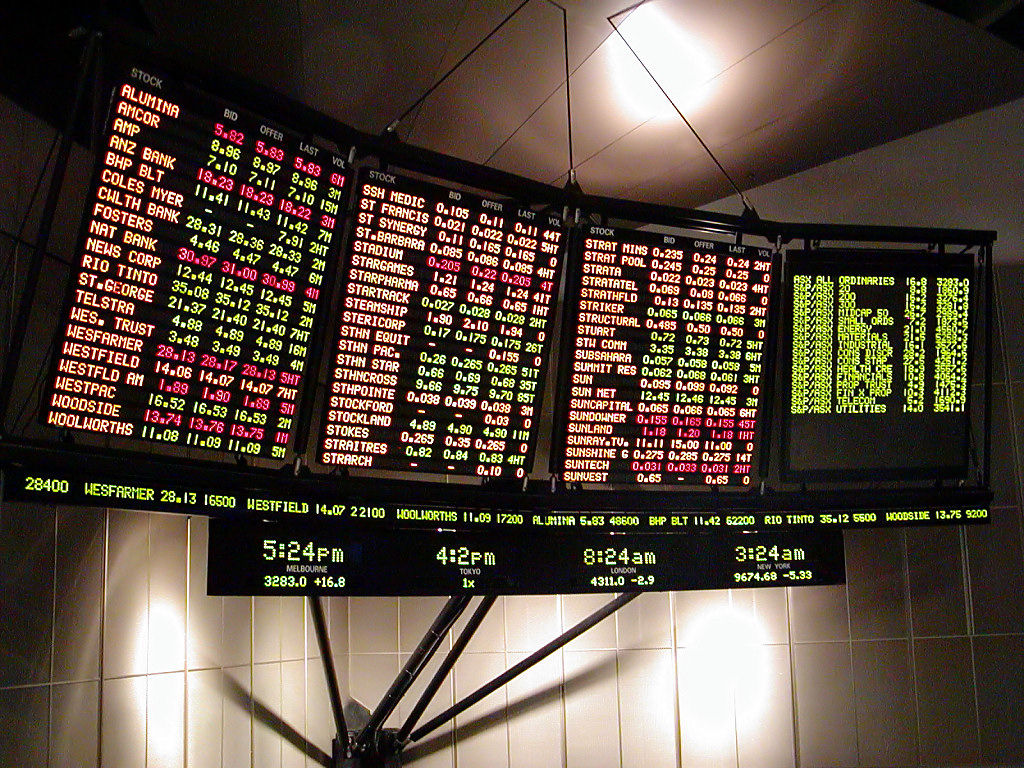
A modern price-ticker. This infrastructure underpins contemporary exchanges, evidencing prices and related ticker symbols. The ticker symbol is represented by a unique set of characters used to identify the subject of the financial transaction.

Investment management is the professional asset management of various "securities" — typically shares and bonds, but also other assets, such as real estate, commodities and alternative investments — in order to meet specified investment goals for the benefit of investors.

As above, investors may be institutions, such as insurance companies, pension funds, corporations, charities, educational establishments, or private investors, either directly via investment contracts or, more commonly, via collective investment schemes like mutual funds, exchange-traded funds, or real estate investment trusts.

At the heart of investment management is asset allocation—diversifying the exposure among these asset classes, and among individual securities within each asset class—as appropriate to the client's investment policy, in turn, a function of risk profile, investment goals, and investment horizon (see Investor profile). Here:

- Portfolio optimization is the process of selecting the best portfolio given the client's objectives and constraints.
- Fundamental analysis is the approach typically applied in valuing and evaluating the individual securities.
- Technical analysis is about forecasting future asset prices with past data.

Overlaid is the portfolio manager's investment style—broadly, active vs passive, value vs growth, and small cap vs. large cap—and investment strategy.

In a well-diversified portfolio, achieved investment performance will, in general, largely be a function of the asset mix selected, while the individual securities are less impactful. The specific approach or philosophy will also be significant, depending on the extent to which it is complementary with the market cycle.

In addition to this diversification, the fundamental risk mitigant employed, investment managers will apply various hedging techniques as appropriate; these may relate to the portfolio as a whole or to individual stocks. Bond portfolios are often (instead) managed via cash flow matching or immunization, while for derivative portfolios and positions, traders use "the Greeks" to measure and then offset sensitivities. In parallel, managers – active and passive – will monitor tracking error, thereby minimizing and preempting any underperformance vs their "benchmark".

A quantitative fund is managed using computer-based mathematical techniques (increasingly, machine learning) instead of human judgment. The actual trading is typically automated via sophisticated algorithms.

=== Risk management ===
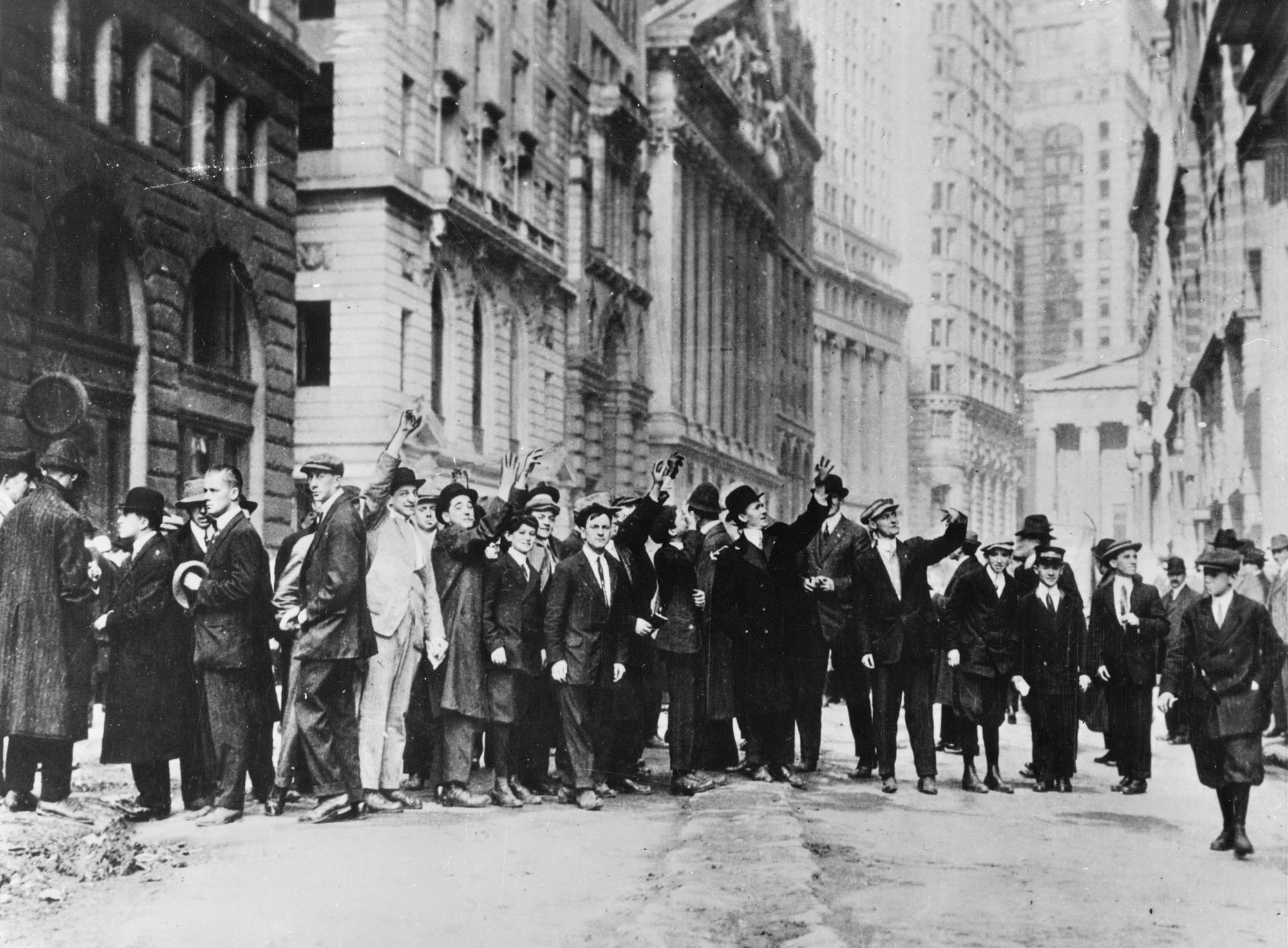
Crowds gathering outside the New York Stock Exchange after the Wall Street crash of 1929

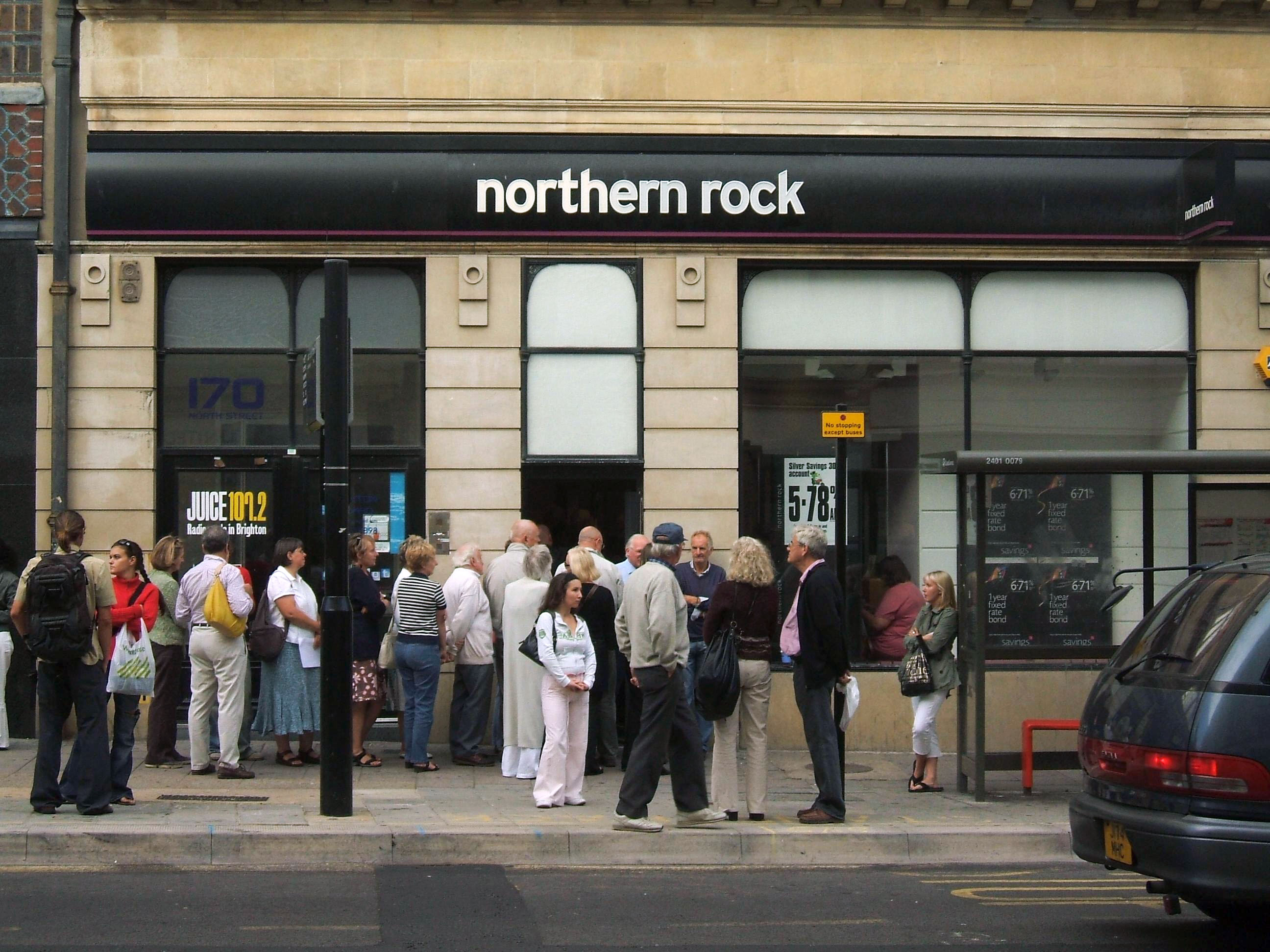
Customers queuing outside a Northern Rock branch in the United Kingdom to withdraw their savings during the 2008 financial crisis

Risk management, in general, is the study of how to control risks and balance the possibility of gains; it is the process of measuring risk and then developing and implementing strategies to manage that risk. Financial risk management is the practice of protecting corporate value against financial risks, often by "hedging" exposure to these using financial instruments. The focus is particularly on credit and market risk, and in banks, through regulatory capital, includes operational risk.

- Credit risk is the risk of default on a debt that may arise from a borrower failing to make required payments;
- Market risk relates to losses arising from movements in market variables such as prices and exchange rates;
- Operational risk relates to failures in internal processes, people, and systems, or to external events (these risks will often be insured).

Financial risk management is related to corporate finance in two ways. Firstly, firm exposure to market risk is a direct result of previous capital investments and funding decisions; while credit risk arises from the business's credit policy and is often addressed through credit insurance and provisioning. Secondly, both disciplines share the goal of enhancing or at least preserving, the firm's economic value, and in this context overlaps also enterprise risk management, typically the domain of strategic management. Here, businesses devote much time and effort to forecasting, analytics and performance monitoring. (See ALM and treasury management.)

For banks and other wholesale institutions, risk management focuses on managing, and as necessary hedging, the various positions held by the institution—both trading positions and long term exposures—and on calculating and monitoring the resultant economic capital, and regulatory capital under Basel III. The calculations here are mathematically sophisticated, and within the domain of quantitative finance as below. Credit risk is inherent in the business of banking, but additionally, these institutions are exposed to counterparty credit risk. Banks typically employ Middle office "Risk Groups", whereas front office risk teams provide risk "services" (or "solutions") to customers.

Insurers manage their own risks with a focus on solvency and the ability to pay claims: life insurers are concerned more with longevity risk and interest rate risk; short-term insurers (property insurance, health insurance, casualty insurance) emphasize catastrophe modeling and claims volatility risks. For expected claims reserves are set aside periodically, while to absorb unexpected losses, a minimum level of capital is maintained.

=== Quantitative finance ===
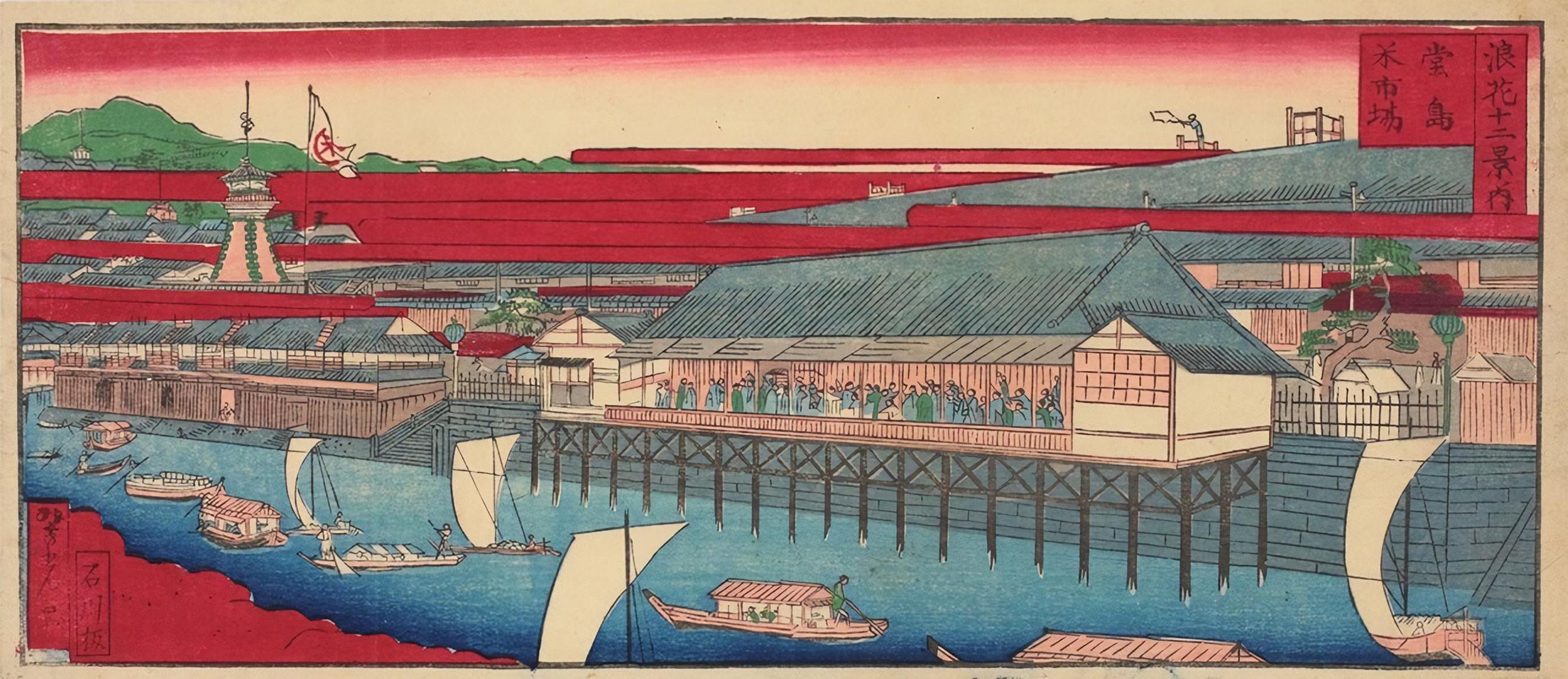
Dōjima Rice Exchange, the world's first futures exchange, established in Osaka in 1697

Quantitative finance—also referred to as "mathematical finance"—includes those finance activities where a sophisticated mathematical model is required, and thus overlaps several of the above.

As a specialized practice area, quantitative finance comprises primarily three sub-disciplines; the underlying theory and techniques are discussed in the next section:

1. Quantitative finance is often synonymous with financial engineering. This area generally underpins a bank's customer-driven derivatives business—delivering bespoke OTC-contracts and "exotics", and designing the various structured products and solutions mentioned—and encompasses modeling and programming in support of the initial trade, and its subsequent hedging and management.
2. Quantitative finance also significantly overlaps financial risk management in banking, as mentioned, both as regards this hedging, and as regards economic capital as well as compliance with regulations and Basel III.
3. "Quants" are also responsible for building and deploying the investment strategies at the quantitative funds mentioned; they are also involved in quantitative investing more generally, in areas such as trading strategy formulation, and in automated trading, high-frequency trading, algorithmic trading, and program trading.

== Financial theory ==
$$\sum_{t=1}^n \frac{FCFF_t}{(1+WACC_{t})^t} +
\frac{\left[\frac{FCFF_{n+1}}{(WACC_{n+1}-g_{n+1})}\right]}{(1+WACC_{n})^n}$$

DCF valuation formula widely applied in business and finance, since articulated in 1938. Here, to get the value of the firm, its forecasted free cash flows are discounted to the present using the weighted average cost of capital for the discount factor. For share valuation investors use the related dividend discount model.

Finance - as outlined - examines the management of money and the uses and sources of cash, including decisions that weigh the timing and risk of expected cash flows. Specific theory here is developed for the various application areas within the disciplines of management, accountancy, (financial) economics and applied mathematics.

=== Managerial finance ===
Managerial finance is the branch of finance that deals with the financial aspects of the management of a company, and the financial dimension of managerial decision-making more broadly. It provides the theoretical underpin for the practice described above, concerning itself with the managerial application of the various finance techniques. Academics working in this area are typically based in business school finance departments, in accounting, or in management science.

The tools addressed and developed relate in the main to managerial accounting and corporate finance: the former allow management to better understand, and hence act on, financial information relating to profitability and performance; the latter, as above, are about optimizing the overall financial structure, including its impact on working capital. Key aspects of managerial finance thus include:

- Capital budgeting
- Capital structure
- Working capital management
- Risk management
- Financial analysis and reporting

A firm's finance department implements the firm's policy objectives, monitors results, and responds to strategic and tactical changes.

=== Financial economics ===
The "efficient frontier", was first formulated by Harry Markowitz in 1952 as a prototypical concept in modern portfolio theory. In the Markowitz model, an "efficient" portfolio has the best possible expected return for its level of risk (represented by the standard deviation of return).

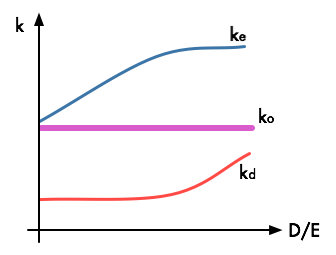
Modigliani–Miller theorem, a foundational element of finance theory, introduced in 1958; it forms the basis for modern thinking on capital structure. Even if leverage (D/E) increases, the weighted average cost of capital (k0) stays constant.

Financial economics is the branch of economics that studies the interrelation of financial variables, such as prices, interest rates and shares, as opposed to real economic variables, i.e. goods and services. It thus centers on pricing, decision making, and risk management in the financial markets, and produces many of the commonly employed financial models. (Financial econometrics is the branch of financial economics that uses econometric techniques to parameterize the relationships suggested.)

The discipline has two main areas of focus: asset pricing and corporate finance; the first being the perspective of providers of capital, i.e. investors, and the second of users of capital; respectively:

1. Asset pricing theory develops the models used in determining the risk-appropriate discount rate, and in pricing derivatives; and includes the portfolio- and investment theory applied in asset management. The analysis essentially explores how rational investors would apply risk and return to the problem of investment under uncertainty, producing the key "Fundamental theorem of asset pricing". Here, the twin assumptions of rationality and market efficiency lead to modern portfolio theory (the CAPM), and to the Black–Scholes theory for option valuation. At more advanced levels—and often in response to financial crises—the study then extends these "neoclassical" models to incorporate phenomena where their assumptions do not hold, or to more general settings.
2. Much of corporate finance theory, by contrast, considers investment under "certainty" (Fisher separation theorem, "theory of investment value", and Modigliani–Miller theorem). Here, theory and methods are developed for the decisions about funding, dividends, and capital structure discussed above. A recent development is to incorporate uncertainty and contingency—and thus various elements of asset pricing—into these decisions, employing for example real options analysis.

=== Financial mathematics ===
$$\begin{align}
C(S, t) &= N(d_1)S - N(d_2) Ke^{-r(T - t)} \\
d_1 &= \frac{1}{\sigma\sqrt{T - t}}\left[\ln\left(\frac{S}{K}\right) + \left(r + \frac{\sigma^2}{2}\right)(T - t)\right] \\
d_2 &= d_1 - \sigma\sqrt{T - t} \\
\end{align}$$

The Black–Scholes formula for the value of a call option. Although lately its use is considered naive, it has underpinned the development of derivatives-theory, and financial mathematics more generally, since its introduction in 1973.

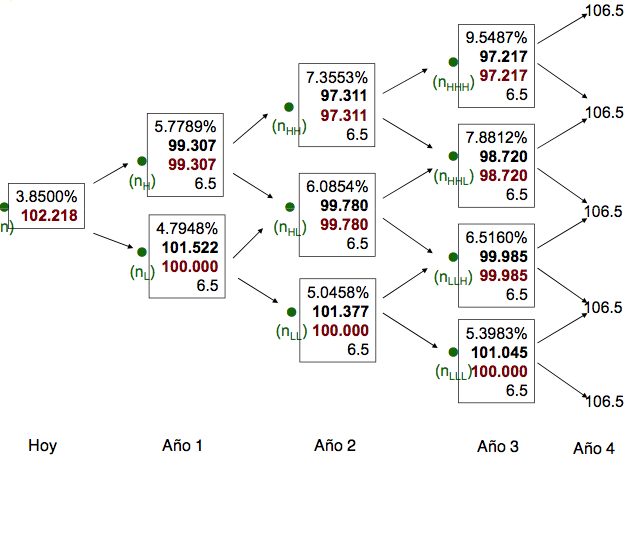
"Trees" are widely applied in mathematical finance; here used in calculating an OAS. Other common pricing-methods are simulation and PDEs. These are used for settings beyond those envisaged by Black-Scholes. Post crisis, even in those settings, banks use local and stochastic volatility models to incorporate the volatility surface, while the xVA adjustments accommodate counterparty and capital considerations.

Financial mathematics is the field of applied mathematics concerned with financial markets; Louis Bachelier's doctoral thesis, defended in 1900, is considered to be the first scholarly work in this area. The field is largely focused on the modeling of derivatives—with much emphasis on interest rate- and credit risk modeling—while other important areas include insurance mathematics and quantitative portfolio management. Relatedly, the techniques developed are applied to pricing and hedging a wide range of asset-backed, government, and corporate-securities.

As above, in terms of practice, the field is referred to as quantitative finance and / or mathematical finance, and comprises primarily the three areas discussed. The main mathematical tools and techniques are, correspondingly:

- for derivatives, Itô's stochastic calculus, simulation, and partial differential equations; see aside boxed discussion re the prototypical Black-Scholes model and the various numeric techniques now applied
- for risk management, value at risk, stress testing and "sensitivities" analysis (applying the "greeks"); the underlying mathematics comprises mixture models, PCA, volatility clustering and copulas.
- in both of these areas, and particularly for portfolio problems, quants employ sophisticated optimization techniques

Mathematically, these separate into two analytic branches: derivatives pricing uses risk-neutral probability (or arbitrage-pricing probability), denoted by "Q"; while risk and portfolio management generally use physical (or actual or actuarial) probability, denoted by "P". These are interrelated through the above "Fundamental theorem of asset pricing".

The subject is closely related to financial economics, which, as outlined, focuses on much of the underlying theory involved in financial mathematics: generally, financial mathematics will derive and extend the mathematical models suggested. Computational finance is the branch of (applied) computer science that deals with problems of practical interest in finance, and especially emphasizes the numerical methods applied here.

=== Experimental finance ===
Experimental finance aims to establish different market settings and environments to experimentally observe and provide a lens through which science can analyze agents' behavior and the resulting characteristics of trading flows, information diffusion, and aggregation, price setting mechanisms, and returns processes. Researchers in experimental finance study how well existing financial economics theories make accurate predictions and seek to validate them. They also aim to discover new principles to extend these theories for future financial decisions. This research often involves conducting trading simulations or observing human behavior in artificial, competitive, market-like environments.

=== Behavioral finance ===
Behavioral finance studies how the psychology of investors or managers affects financial decisions and markets and is relevant when making a decision that can impact either negatively or positively on one of their areas. With more in-depth research into behavioral finance, it is possible to bridge what actually happens in financial markets with analysis based on financial theory. Behavioral finance has grown over the last few decades to become an integral aspect of finance. Nowadays there is a need for more theory and testing of the effects of feelings on financial decisions. Especially, because now the time has come to move beyond behavioral finance to social finance, which studies the structure of social interactions, how financial ideas spread, and how social processes affect financial decisions and outcomes.

Behavioral finance includes such topics as:

1. Empirical studies that demonstrate significant deviations from classical theories;
2. Models of how psychology affects and impacts trading and prices;
3. Forecasting based on these methods;
4. Studies of experimental asset markets and the use of models to forecast experiments.

A strand of behavioral finance has been dubbed quantitative behavioral finance, which uses mathematical and statistical methodologies to understand behavioral biases in conjunction with valuation.

=== Quantum finance ===
Quantum finance involves applying quantum mechanical approaches to financial theory, providing novel methods and perspectives in the field. Quantum finance is an interdisciplinary field, in which theories and methods developed by quantum physicists and economists are applied to solve financial problems. It represents a branch known as econophysics. Although quantum computational methods have been around for quite some time and use the basic principles of physics to better understand the ways to implement and manage cash flows, it is mathematics that is actually important in this new scenario. Finance theory is heavily based on financial instrument pricing, such as stock option pricing. Many of the problems facing the finance community have no known analytical solution. As a result, numerical methods and computer simulations for solving these problems have proliferated. This research area is known as computational finance. Many computational finance problems have a high degree of computational complexity and are slow to converge to a solution on classical computers. In particular, when it comes to option pricing, there is additional complexity resulting from the need to respond to quickly changing markets. For example, in order to take advantage of inaccurately priced stock options, the computation must complete before the next change in the almost continuously changing stock market. As a result, the finance community is always looking for ways to overcome the resulting performance issues that arise when pricing options. This has led to research that applies alternative computing techniques to finance. The most commonly used quantum financial models are the quantum continuous model, the quantum binomial model, multi-step quantum binomial model, etc.

== History of finance ==
The origin of finance can be traced to the beginning of state formation and trade during the Bronze Age. The earliest historical evidence of finance is dated to around 3000 BCE. Banking originated in West Asia, where temples and palaces were used as safe places for the storage of valuables. Initially, the only valuable that could be deposited was grain, but cattle and precious materials were eventually included. During the same period, the Sumerian city of Uruk in Mesopotamia supported trade by lending as well as the use of interest. In Sumerian, "interest" was mas, which translates to "calf". In Greece and Egypt, the words used for interest, tokos and ms respectively, meant "to give birth". In these cultures, interest indicated a valuable increase, and seemed to consider it from the lender's point of view. The Code of Hammurabi (1792–1750 BCE) included laws governing banking operations. The Babylonians were accustomed to charging interest at the rate of 20 percent per year. By 1200 BCE, cowrie shells were used as a form of money in China.

The use of coins as a means of representing money began in the years between 700 and 500 BCE. Herodotus mentions the use of crude coins in Lydia around 687 BCE and, by 640 BCE, the Lydians had started to use coin money more widely and opened permanent retail shops. Shortly after, cities in Classical Greece, such as Aegina, Athens, and Corinth, started minting their own coins between 595 and 570 BCE. During the Roman Republic, interest was outlawed by the Lex Genucia reforms in 342 BCE, though the provision went largely unenforced. Under Julius Caesar, a ceiling on interest rates of 12% was set, and much later under Justinian it was lowered even further to between 4% and 8%.

The first stock exchange was opened in Antwerp in 1531. Since then, popular exchanges such as the London Stock Exchange (founded in 1773) and the New York Stock Exchange (founded in 1793) were created.

== See also ==
- 2008 financial crisis
- Outline of finance
