= Treasury management system =

Financial software application

A treasury management system (TMS) is a software application which automates the process of managing a company's financial operations. It helps companies to manage their financial activities, such as cash flow, assets and investments, automatically. A TMS is commonly used to maintain financial security and minimize reputational risk. It can be used by a company's internal management, and may be purchased from a technical supplier.

== Functions ==
A TMS can use data to analyze and report payments, cash management and flow, banking and accounting. Its functions are:

- Real-time cash management: Cash management aims to increase available cash and reduce shortfalls as quickly as possible. It enables companies to eliminate unnecessary expenses and possible financial risks. A TMS provides a range of uses for cash balances and can access business accounts at any time. Users can view accounts in detail, including savings and lending balances and transaction histories.
- Cash-flow forecasting: This projects expectations of revenue, operating expenses and profit and is a primary business task. A TMS can predict estimated annual sales and expenses (including time frames), influencing a company's direction.
- Payment reconciliation: A TMS' payment-reconciliation software reports discrepancies in account transactions between internal and external sources. Reconciliation automatically ensures that a business's financial transactions match those of a bank, credit card company or other financial institution for investigation by accounting staff and analysis of discrepancies. The software includes auditing and local work-process approval, standardizing workflow, and collating and integrating financial documents for review.
- Debt management: Debt may help a business achieve its objectives, and a TMS can manage debt to minimize cost.
- Trade finance: A TMS can manage trade finance, a driver of economic development. It includes lending facilities, issuing letters of credit, export factoring (assets against invoices or accounts receivable), and export credit and delivery insurance. A TMS reduces the amount of paperwork involved in trade finance, and can help free up cash (via factoring) and centralize data. Trade-finance software offers businesses automated processing of import and export documentation, remittances and negotiation.
- Technology: TMS software has become more sophisticated to deal with globalization. With a single local function, TMS technology might rely on a spreadsheet or bank system for bank reporting, financial evaluation and lending management.

There are two types of the TMS: local and cloud-hosted (or cloud-based) systems. Local systems are installed on a business's home server, and enable maximum control of features and security protocols. Cloud-hosted systems are more economical, more serviceable and can be deployed more quickly.

== Trends ==
TMSs are transferring to, and improving, the cloud-based system. Software as a service (SaaS, a subscription system) can upgrade more quickly and is becoming more popular. The most important part of a cloud-based system is data protection, and improved data encryption or databases in a country with tight data security laws is a TMS trend; market consolidation is also a trend, enhancing functionality. An increasing number of companies have adopted cloud-based systems, which are evolving in features and security.

== See also ==
- Treasury management
