= Production budget =

Term used in film production

Production budget is a term used specifically in film production and, more generally, in business.

A "film production budget" determines how much will be spent on the entire film project. This involves identifying the elements and then estimating their cost, for each phase of filmmaking (development, pre-production, production, post-production and distribution). The budget structure normally separates "above-the-line" (creative), and "below-the-line" (technical) costs.

In business, "production budget" refers to the budget set by a corporation for the number of units of a product that will be required and produced; see demand forecasting, capacity planning and Revenue management § Forecasting; and financial forecast more generally.

== See also ==
- Film budgeting
- Television crew
- Corporate budget

== Sources ==
- Film Budgeting by Ralph S. Singleton (1996)
- Film Production Management by Bastian Clevé (2nd ed, 2000)
- The Complete Film Production Handbook (3rd ed, 2001)
- The On Production Budget Book by Robert J. Koster (1997)
- Production Management for TV and Film. The Professional's Guide by Linda Stradling 2010 (Methuen)
