= Funds transfer pricing =

Measure of how contributions make up an institution's profitability

The Fund Transfer Pricing (FTP) measures the contribution by each source of funding to the overall profitability in a financial institution. Funds that go toward lending products are charged to asset-generating businesses whereas funds generated by deposit and other funding products are credited to liability-generating businesses.

== Details ==
FTP is used to adjust the reported performance of different business units of a financial institution. A financial institution could have different kinds of business units. FTP can be understood as a mechanism for distributing revenue between profit centres, which can contribute to better financial performance evaluation of these business units. The split of these units between deposit-raising units and funds-advancing units affects whether they receive a positive or negative revenue adjustment. Both borrowing and lending contribute to the performance of the bank as a whole. FTP is a mechanism to adjust these profitabilities to incorporate true funding costs. Therefore, FTP can be seen as an internal measurement tool to demonstrate the financial impact of destination and source of funds.

The two major objectives of FTP in financial institutions are motivating profitable actions and comparable financial performance evaluation among business units, and when properly utilized, transfer pricing systems allow comparable financial performance evaluation of net fund generators and net fund users. Without an FTP system, net fund users receive credit for interest income without being charged for the total amount of interest expense associated, while net fund generators are charged by interest expense without being credited with revenue of interest associated. In such an environment, net fund users have an advantage because all interest revenues are linked to financial assets and all financial expenses are linked to financial liabilities, and this causes a distortion in business units’ financial performance as net fund users present themselves as more profitable than net fund providers.<

FTP is an important concept of how financial institutions determine the internal price when allocating funds across different business units. The Organisation for Economic Co-operation and Development (OECD) recommends that each financial institution should have its FTP policy governing the basis on which funds are transferred between different business units and treasury. In financial institutions adopting FTP, the treasury is responsible for liquidity management and the internal pricing of funds to its different business units. One can think of the treasury as a financial institution within the financial institution: it buys funds from the business units, managing the liability side of the financial institution, and sells funds to the divisions that invest in banking assets.

FTP is a specific type of transfer pricing and is identified by the Organisation for Economic Co-operation and Development (OECD) as a treasury dealing. FTP measures the value of funds transferred through the treasury between business units within a financial institution. Internal exchanges that are measured by transfer prices result in (1) revenue for the business unit furnishing (i.e. selling) the funds and (2) costs for the business unit receiving (i.e., buying) the funds. Considering a centralised organisation, internal trade is mandated and the fund transfer price unilaterally determined by the treasury. Under centralization, the treasury maintains control over decisions and seeks to maximize the financial institutions’ overall profit. As expected, given the centralized decision making, the transfer price does not affect profit itself, only how it is split among the business units. Finally, financial institutions should manage FTP centrally through a treasury, with sufficient oversight provided by independent risk and financial control staff.

Given the importance of measuring the performance of business units and appropriate funding structure for its activities, the financial institution should document how business units have obtained the resources for its operations.

== History ==
The way financial institutions manage and assess performance internally is closely intertwined with choices made in terms of operational structures. For instance, financial institutions organised as separate business units are expected to have different amounts for both origination and placement of funds, and the performance of these business units are therefore determined locally and heavily influenced by the local business environment. This type of structure creates the need for a transfer price mechanism between the business units to avoid the distortion in performance caused due to the transferral of funds (through treasury) between the business units.

There is evidence that FTP only came to attention following the 2008 financial crisis, suggesting that economic constraints (e.g., liquidity issues) lead to the implementation of policies requiring FTP. Before the 2008 financial crisis, the pricing of liquidity costs was deemed immaterial and FTP was used by some financial services (mostly by practitioners) to measure performance internally. Due to the 2008 financial crisis, requirements for monitoring liquidity in financial institutions are implemented by many regulators, including FTP. The extensive list of regulators that discuss the implementation of FTP in financial institutions included the Basel Committee on Banking Supervision (BCBS), European Parliament and the European Commission (EC), the Committee for European Banking Supervisors (CEBS), the Institute for International Finance (IIF), the Counterparty Risk Management Policy Group III (CRMPGIII), the US Federal Reserve, and the US Federal Deposit Insurance Corporation. Formalized processes include requiring large banks to prepare funds transfer pricing reports and a standardized funds transfer pricing process be implemented across the institution.

== Banking and finance ==
An FTP framework allows the bank to value the marginal contribution of the individual loans and deposits on its books - where each instrument is valued by calculating an appropriate charge on the asset side (loans) and a credit to the liability side (deposits); see aside example. These are then aggregated to determine overall bank-profit.

Example position valuation

If a bank can obtain 3-year borrowing at 3% but is only paying 2% on their 3-year customer deposits (CDs) then each CD is providing 1% of the value each of the 3 years it is open. The net interest margin assigned to the CD would be 1% multiplied by the balance in each of the 3 years. The same calculation is made on the loan side. For example, if a bank is making a 3-year fixed loan at 4% and they can obtain 3-year borrowing from an outside source at 3%, then the loan would be providing 1% value (multiplied by the balance) each of the 3 years the loan is open.

FTP is thus integral to a banks balance sheet optimization efforts, and is an important component of an integrated profitability reporting solution. An accurate knowledge of these charges and credits is also critical to asset and liability management (ALM), and to the management of overall interest rate- and liquidity risk. It is also of increased relevance re regulatory requirements, as banks are expected to state their funding costs accurately, as these affect the bank's liquidity.

In implementing an FTP system, an intermediary is created within the organisation - usually Treasury or central office. Then, as outlined:

- The fund-raising (deposit taking) units raise funds from the market at a particular rate and lend the same to the central office at a higher rate. For a deposit-raising unit, the difference between interest paid to the deposit-holders and interest receivable from the central office is the contribution to the bank's profitability.
- The lending (or trading) units borrow the funds from the central office at a particular rate and lend the same to the borrowers at a higher rate. For a lending division, the difference between Interest payable to the central office and the interest received from the borrowers is the contribution to the bank's performance.
- The central office rate is notional in nature and is aligned to market conditions. Thus for all the units, there are two rates available to measure the performance.

FTP therefore functions as a revenue "adjustment" made to the bank's balance sheet to reflect the cost of funding, based on the bank's cost of borrowing at the time of origination. The value assigned to a deposit account would thus be equal to the difference between the cost of an equivalent term borrowing, less the cost that is being paid on the instrument; a loan, likewise would return a profit of its interest less the rate paid to treasury. For example, a business unit which manages funds for High-net-worth individuals will create cash which is held on deposit. That deposit will accrue interest and therefore the wealth business unit's profits will have to be increased by the deposit interest which can easily be calculated by using the prevailing rate of interest.

Failure to calculate FTP correctly can, however, cause loans to be much less profitable than they initially appear. The "opportunity cost" approach, outlined above, therefore became problematic during the 2008 financial crisis. There, actual interest rates paid began to differ from published rates such as LIBOR or bank base rates, and with poor credit availability, the profit adjustment made in favour of depositing business units were effectively understated. (This had been less of an issue when banks' borrowing costs were close to base rates or quoted rates such as LIBOR.) A further important issue is the need to value funding costs on an arm's length basis. Thus the fact that a loan is made between business units may reflect agreed or contracted recognition of costs (too low in the financial crisis), rather than prevailing actual accurate funding costs. Note that this is additionally an important audit concern and of taxation interest as transfer pricing affects where and in which business unit profit is reported.

Accurate calculation of charges and credits is therefore critical. This calculation will necessarily incorporate a liquidity term premium, as well as an appropriate adjustment for interest rate risk and liquidity risk. Inclusion of other risk components (usually FX risk and credit risk) varies substantially from bank to bank and depends on product characteristics. The calculation is additionally complicated by contract- or customer-specific factors: (i) the length of time an asset or liability is repaid may not be clearly contracted or specified; (ii) the extent to which an asset has been or can be securitised affects its liquidity; (iii) the behaviour of customers in particular product/customer niches such as customers' propensity to withdraw long-term deposits at a penalty, or to repay obligations such as mortgages early. It is the latter especially, which complicates the calculation of FTP and has required significant and expensive changes to banking systems. Balance sheets therefore now incorporate new attributes for customer and product which were not previously significant reporting dimensions.

== Management accounting ==
The implementation of FTP gives way for management accountants to play a more significant role within the financial service industry under a performance evaluation focus. Financial institutions can use FTP to evaluate the profitability of deposits and loans, and academics and antitrust authorities may use FTP to evaluate the degree of competition in the financial service industry. Evidence of how FTP is relevant for management accountants is brought in several surveys.

Performance measures are potentially incomplete, and FTP can provide incremental information in the managerial decision process. FTP can assist management accountants in identifying and addressing issues associated with distortions in business units’ performance by developing a comprehensive performance measurement system that incorporates the effects of the business environment. There is evidence that management accountants in the financial service industry are willing to use FTP as a performance measure, and management accountants in the financial service industry seem to be firmly committed to financial measures for measuring performance.

The set fund transfer price should depend on the overall strategy of the financial institution. Setting a price for the funds transferred through treasury should consider the cost of obtaining such funds by tracing its source and determining the actual rate incurred (i.e., tracing approach) or regard the funds as contributing to the whole financial institution's funding needs, and not simply to a business unit's funding needs (i.e., fungibility approach). As advised by the OECD, financial institutions should allocate margins between various business units within the financial institution following the arm's length principle. Through an economics perspective, the transfer price should be equal to marginal cost. On a practical approach, FTP may be set using an interest rate curve based on the marginal funding costs faced by the financial institution.

A given fund transfer price will impact the measured performance of business units based on whether such business units are short of funds or have an excess of funds. The key variable which should be considered for setting the fund transfer price is the strategy of the financial institution (i.e. corporate strategy). A high fund transfer price rewards business units that have an excess of funds and a low fund transfer rewards business units that are short of funds.

However, management choosing to adopt FTP must be aware of two potential problems. First, management has to determine a fund transfer pricing interest rate which aligns with the organization's strategy. Business units which are net fund generators benefit from higher fund transfer price interest rates whilst net fund users benefit from lower fund transfer price interest rates. Second, management has to enforce transfer pricing policy as some business units may lack incentives to adopt such policy. Although fund transfer price does not distort the analysis of the overall financial performance of the organization, using fund transfer pricing some business units may be making a loss even though the organization is profitable.
