= Budget =

Balance sheet or statement of estimated receipts and expenditures

A budget is a calculation plan, usually but not always financial, for a defined period, often one year or a month. A budget may include anticipated sales volumes and revenues, resource quantities including time, costs and expenses, environmental impacts such as greenhouse gas emissions, other impacts, assets, liabilities and cash flows. Companies, governments, families, and other organizations use budgets to express strategic plans of activities in measurable terms.

Preparing a budget allows companies, authorities, private entities or families to establish priorities and evaluate the achievement of their objectives. To achieve these goals it may be necessary to incur a deficit (expenses exceed income) or, on the contrary, it may be possible to save, in which case the budget will present a surplus (income exceed expenses).

In the field of commerce, a budget is also a financial document or report that details the cost that a service will have if performed. Whoever makes the budget must adhere to it and cannot change it if the client accepts the service.

A budget expresses intended expenditures along with proposals for how to meet them with resources. A budget may express a surplus, providing resources for use at a future time, or a deficit in which expenditures exceed income or other resources.

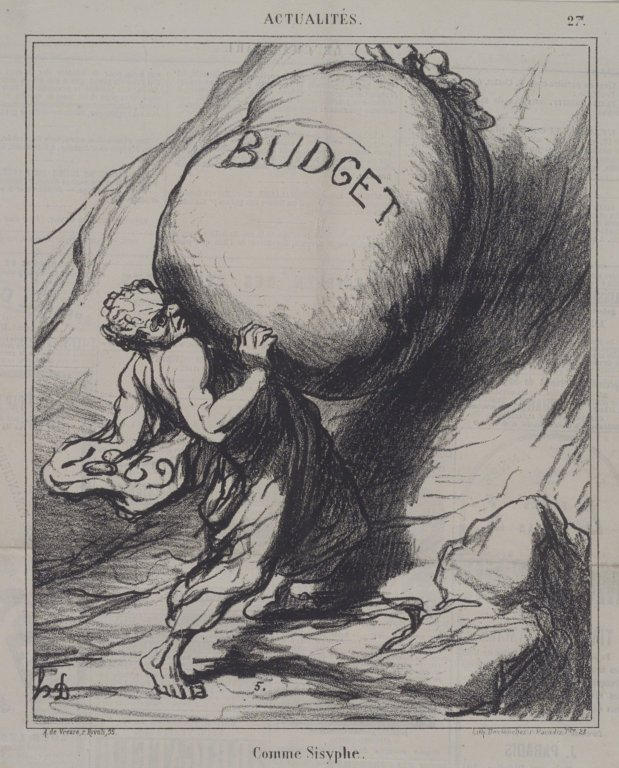
Comme Sisyphe – Honoré Daumier (Brooklyn Museum)

== Government ==
The budget of a government is a summary or plan of the anticipated resources (often but not always from taxes) and expenditures of that government. There are three types of government budgets: the operating or current budget, the capital or investment budget, and the cash or cash flow budget.

=== By country ===
==== United States ====
The federal budget is prepared by the Office of Management and Budget, and submitted to Congress for consideration. Invariably, Congress makes many and substantial changes. Nearly all American states are required to have balanced budgets, but the federal government is allowed to run deficits.

==== India ====
The budget is prepared by the Budget Division Department of Economic Affairs of the Ministry of Finance annually. The Finance Minister is the head of the budget making committee. The present Indian Finance minister is Nirmala Sitharaman. The Budget includes supplementary excess grants and when a proclamation by the President as to failure of Constitutional machinery is in operation in relation to a State or a Union Territory, preparation of the Budget of such State. The first budget of India was submitted on 18 February 1860 by James Wilson. P C Mahalanobis is known as the father of Indian budget.

==== Philippines ====
The Philippine budget is considered the most complicated in the world, incorporating multiple approaches in one single budget system: line-item (budget execution), performance (budget accountability), and zero-based budgeting. The Department of Budget and Management (DBM) prepares the National Expenditure Program and forwards it to the Committee on Appropriations of the House of Representatives to come up with a General Appropriations Bill (GAB). The GAB will go through budget deliberations and voting; the same process occurs when the GAB is transmitted to the Philippine Senate.

After both houses of Congress approves the GAB, the President signs the bill into a General Appropriations Act (GAA); also, the President may opt to veto the GAB and have it returned to the legislative branch or leave the bill unsigned for 30 days and lapse into law. There are two types of budget bill veto: the line-item veto and the veto of the whole budget.

== Personal ==
A personal budget or home budget is a finance plan that allocates future personal income towards expenses, savings and debt repayment. Past spending and personal debt are considered when creating a personal budget. There are several methods and tools available for creating, using, and adjusting a personal budget. For example, jobs are an income source, while bills and rent payments are expenses. A third category (other than income and expenses) may be assets (such as property, investments, or other savings or value) representing a potential reserve for funds in case of budget shortfalls.

== Corporate budget ==
The budget of a business, division, or corporation is a financial forecast for the near-term future, usually the next accounting period, aggregating the expected revenues and expenses of the various departments – operations, human resources, IT, etc. It is thus a key element in integrated business planning, with measurable targets correspondingly devolved to departmental managers (and becoming KPIs); budgets may then also specify non-cash resources, such as staff or time.

The budgeting process requires considerable effort, often involving dozens of staff; final sign-off resides with both the financial director and operations director. The responsibility usually sits within the company's financial management area in general, sometimes, specifically in "FP&A". Professionals employed in this role are often designated "Budget Analyst", a specialized financial analyst function.

Organisations may produce functional budgets, relating to activities, and / or cash budgets, focused on receipts and payments. Incremental budgeting starts with the budget from the previous period, while under zero-based budgeting activities/costs are included only if justified. Under all approaches expected sales or revenue, is typically the starting point; this will be based on the business' planning for the period in question. Directly related elements and costs are typically linked to these (activity based costing may be employed). Support and management functions may be revisited, and the resultant "fixed" costs, such as rent and payroll, will be adjusted - at a minimum for inflation. Capital expenditure, both new investments and maintenance, may be budgeted separately; debt servicing and repayments likewise. The master budget aggregates these all. See Cash flow forecast, Financial modeling § Accounting.

Whereas the budget is typically compiled on an annual basis - although, e.g. in mining, this may be quarterly - the monitoring is ongoing, with financial and operational adjustments (or interventions) made as warranted; see Financial risk management § Corporate finance for further discussion. Here, if the actual figures delivered come close to those budgeted, this suggests that managers understand their business and have been successful in delivering. On the other hand, if the figures diverge this sends an "out of control" signal; additionally, the share price could suffer where these figures have been communicated to analysts.

Criticism is sometimes directed at the nature of budgeting, and its impact on the organization. Additional to the cost in time and resources, two phenomena are identified as problematic: First, it is suggested that managers will often "game the system" in specifying targets that are easily attainable, and / or in asking for more resources than required, such that the required resources will be budgeted as a compromise. A second observation is that managers' thinking may emphasize short term, operational thinking at the expense of a long term and strategic perspective, particularly when bonus payments are linked to budget. See Strategic planning § Strategic planning vs. financial planning.

== Types of budgets ==
- Sales budget – an estimate of future sales, often broken down into both units. It is used to create company and sales goals.
- Production budget – an estimate of the number of units that must be manufactured to meet the sales goals. The production budget also estimates the various costs involved with manufacturing those units, including labor and material. Created by product oriented companies.
- Capital budget – used to determine whether an organization's long-term investments such as new machinery, replacement machinery, new plants, new products, and research development projects are worth pursuing.
- Cash flow/cash budget – a prediction of future cash receipts and expenditures for a particular time period. It usually covers a period in the short-term future. The cash flow budget helps the business to determine when income will be sufficient to cover expenses and when the company will need to seek outside financing.
- Conditional budgeting is a budgeting approach designed for companies with fluctuating income, high fixed costs, or income depending on sunk costs, as well as NPOs and NGOs.
- Marketing budget – an estimate of the funds needed for promotion, advertising, and public relations in order to market the product or service.
- Project budget – a prediction of the costs associated with a particular company project. These costs include labour, materials, and other related expenses. The project budget is often broken down into specific tasks, with task budgets assigned to each. A cost estimate is used to establish a project budget.
- Revenue budget – consists of revenue receipts of government and the expenditure met from these revenues. Revenues are made up of taxes and other duties that the government levies. Various countries and unions have created four types of tax jurisdictions: interstate, state, local and tax jurisdictions with a special status (Free-trade zones). Each of them provides a money flow to the corresponding revenue budget levels.
- Expenditure budget – includes spending data items.
- Flexibility budget – it is established for fixed cost and variable rate is determined per activity measure for variable cost.
- Appropriation budget – a maximum amount is established for certain expenditure based on management judgement.
- Performance budget – it is mostly used by organization and ministries involved in the development activities. This process of budget takes into account the end results.
- Zero based budget – A budget type where every item added to the budget needs approval and no items are carried forward from the prior years budget. This type of budget has a clear advantage when the limited resources are to be allocated carefully and objectively. Zero based budgeting takes more time to create as all pieces of the budget need to be reviewed by management.
- Personal budget – A budget type focusing on expenses for self or for home, usually involves an income to budget.
