= Financial plan =

Evaluation of one's financial state

In general usage, a financial plan is a comprehensive evaluation of an individual's current pay and future financial state by using current known variables to predict future income, asset values and withdrawal plans. This often includes a budget which organizes an individual's finances and sometimes includes a series of steps or specific goals for spending and saving in the future. This plan allocates future income to various types of expenses, such as rent or utilities, and also reserves some income for short-term and long-term savings. A financial plan is sometimes referred to as an investment plan, but in personal finance, a financial plan can focus on other specific areas such as risk management, estates, college, or retirement. In 2026, 61% of Americans said they had a financial strategy, up from 58% the year before, according to New York Life's Wealth Watch Midyear Outlook.

== Context of business ==
In business, "financial forecast" or "financial plan" can also refer to a projection across a time horizon, typically an annual one, of income and expenses for a company, division, or department; see Budget § Corporate budget. More specifically, a financial plan can also refer to the three primary financial statements (balance sheet, income statement, and cash flow statement) created within a business plan. A financial plan can also be an estimation of cash needs and a decision on how to raise the cash, such as through borrowing or issuing additional shares in a company.

Note that the financial plan may then contain prospective financial statements, which are similar, but different, to those of a budget. Financial plans are the entire financial accounting overview of a company. Complete financial plans contain all periods and transaction types. It's a combination of the financial statements which independently only reflect a past, present, or future state of the company. Financial plans are the collection of the historical, present, and future financial statements; for example, a (historical & present) costly expense from an operational issue is normally presented prior to the issuance of the prospective financial statements which propose a solution to said operational issue.

The confusion surrounding the term "financial plans" might stem from the fact that there are many types of financial statement reports. Individually, financial statements show either the past, present, or future financial results. More specifically, financial statements also only reflect the specific categories which are relevant. For instance, investing activities are not adequately displayed in a balance sheet. A financial plan is a combination of the individual financial statements and reflect all categories of transactions (operations & expenses & investing) over time.

Some period-specific financial statement examples include pro forma statements (historical period) and prospective statements (current and future period). Compilations are a type of service which involves "presenting, in the form of financial statements, information that is the representation of management". There are two types of "prospective financial statements": financial forecasts & financial projections and both relate to the current/future time period. Prospective financial statements are a time period-type of financial statement which may reflect the current/future financial status of a company using three main reports/financial statements: cash flow statement, income statement, and balance sheet. "Prospective financial statements are of two types- forecasts and projections. Forecasts are based on management's expected financial position, results of operations, and cash flows." Pro Forma statements take previously recorded results, the historical financial data, and present a "what-if": "what-if" a transaction had happened sooner.

While the common usage of the term "financial plan" often refers to a formal and defined series of steps or goals, there is some technical confusion about what the term "financial plan" actually means in the industry. For example, one of the industry's leading professional organizations, the Certified Financial Planner Board of Standards, lacks any definition for the term "financial plan" in its Standards of Professional Conduct publication. This publication outlines the professional financial planner's job, and explains the process of financial planning, but the term "financial plan" never appears in the publication's text.

The accounting and finance industries have distinct responsibilities and roles. When the products of their work are combined, it produces a complete picture, a financial plan. A financial analyst studies the data and facts (regulations/standards), which are processed, recorded, and presented by accountants. Normally, finance personnel study the data results - meaning what has happened or what might happen - and propose a solution to an inefficiency. Investors and financial institutions must see both the issue and the solution to make an informed decision. Accountants and financial planners are both involved with presenting issues and resolving inefficiencies, so together, the results and explanation are provided in a financial plan.

== Issues of definition ==
Textbooks used in universities offering financial planning-related courses also generally do not define the term 'financial plan'. For example, Sid Mittra, Anandi P. Sahu, and Robert A Crane, authors of Practicing Financial Planning for Professionals do not define what a financial plan is, but merely defer to the Certified Financial Planner Board of Standards' definition of 'financial planning'.

== Planning ==
When drafting a financial plan, the company should establish the planning horizon, which is the time period of the plan, whether it be on a short-term (usually 12 months) or long-term (two to five years) basis. Also, the individual projects and investment proposals of each operational unit within the company should be totaled and treated as one large project. This process is called aggregation.

== See also ==
- Budget
- Capital budgeting
- Optimism bias
- Personal budget
- Reference class forecasting
