= Financial forecast =

Estimate of future financial outcomes

A financial forecast is an estimate of future financial outcomes for a company or project, usually applied in corporate budgeting, capital budgeting and/or valuation. Depending on context, the term may also refer to a listed company's (quarterly) earnings guidance. For a country or economy, see Economic forecast.

Typically, using historical internal accounting and sales data, in addition to external industry data and economic indicators, a financial forecast represents the analyst's modeled prediction of company outcomes in financial terms over a given time period. For the components and steps of business modeling, see Outline of finance § Financial modeling.

Arguably, the key aspect of preparing a financial forecast is predicting revenue; future costs, fixed and variable, as well as capital, can then be estimated as a function of sales via "common-sized analysis"—where relationships are derived from historical financial ratios and other accounting relationships.

At the same time, the resultant line items must align with the business's operations: in general, growth in revenue will require corresponding increases in working capital, fixed assets (see owner earnings) and associated financing; and in the long term, profitability (and other financial ratios) should tend to the industry average. See Valuation using discounted cash flows § Determine cash flow for each forecast period for a more detailed discussion and other considerations; also Cash flow forecasting.

There is an extensive literature on the accuracy of analyst forecasts of revenue, profit, and share price developments of companies. In general, this literature shows that analysts do not produce better forecasts than simple forecasting models. (In addition to the above outline, for financial forecasts, analysts often also use specific historical financial information, such as the 52-week high of stock prices, to augment their analysis of stock prices.)
