= Socially responsible investing =

Any investment strategy combining both financial performance and social/ethical impact

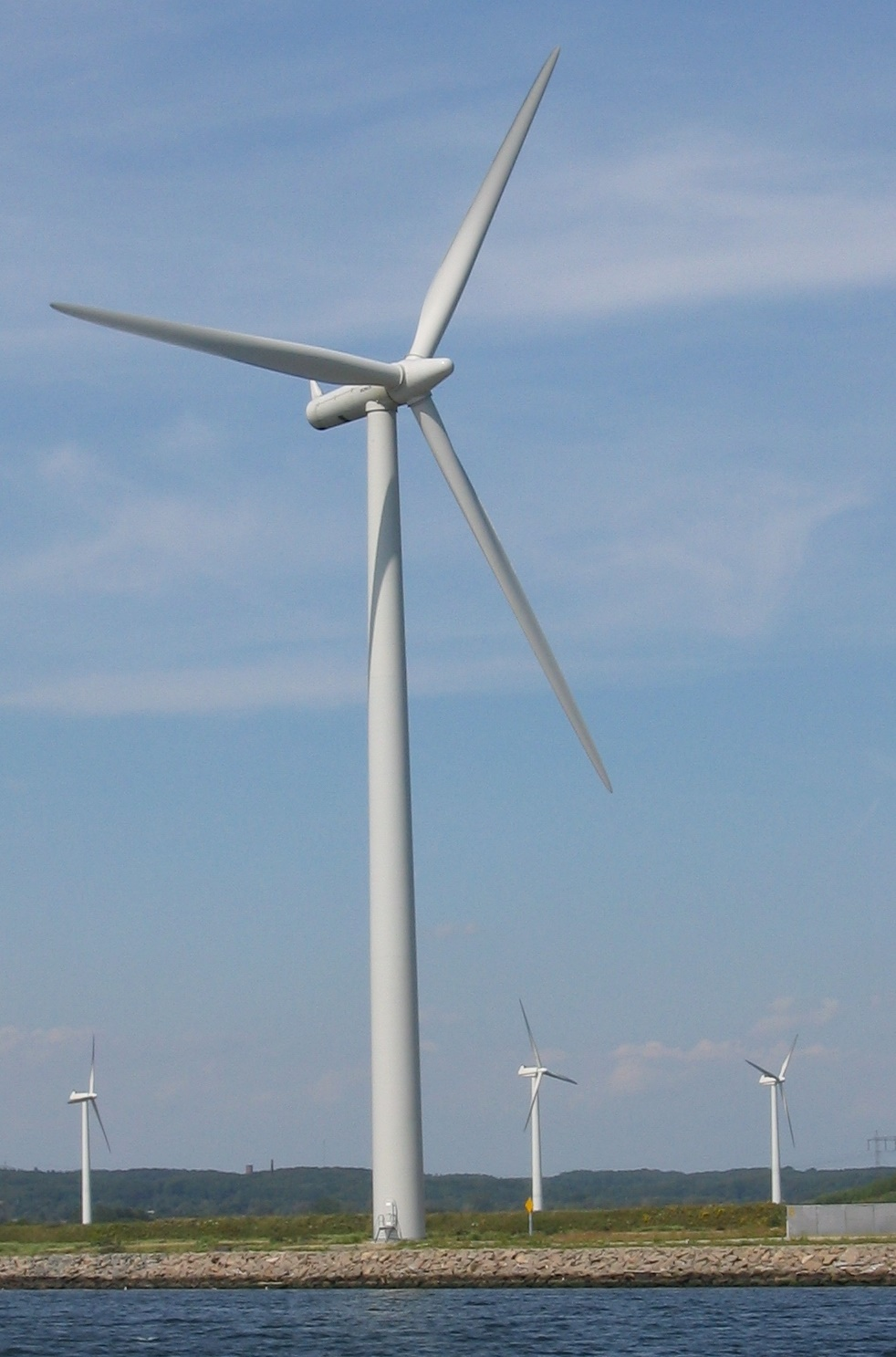
Sustainable energy is one of many forms of sustainable investing.

Socially responsible investing (SRI) (Note: Also termed "responsible", "sustainable", "social", or "ethical" investing.) is any investment strategy which seeks to consider financial return alongside ethical, social or environmental goals. The areas of concern recognized by SRI practitioners are often linked to environmental, social and governance (ESG) topics. Impact investing can be considered a subset of SRI that is generally more proactive and focused on the conscious creation of social or environmental impact through investment. Eco-investing (or green investing) is SRI with a focus on environmentalism.

In general, socially responsible investors encourage corporate practices that they believe promote environmental stewardship, consumer protection, human rights, and racial or gender diversity. Some SRIs avoid investing in businesses perceived to have negative social effects such as alcohol, tobacco, fast food, gambling, pornography, weapons, fossil fuel production or the military. Socially responsible investing is one of several related concepts and approaches that influence and, in some cases, govern how asset managers invest portfolios. The term "socially responsible investing" sometimes narrowly refers to practices that seek to avoid harm by screening companies for ESG risks before deciding whether or not they should be included in an investment portfolio. However, the term is also used more broadly to include more proactive practices such as impact investing, shareholder advocacy and community investing. According to investor Amy Domini, shareholder advocacy and community investing are pillars of socially responsible investing, while doing only negative screening is inadequate.

Measuring social, environmental and ethical issues is nuanced and complex and depends on needs and context. Some rating companies have developed ESG risk ratings and screens as a tool for asset managers. These ratings firms evaluate companies and projects on several risk factors and typically assign an aggregate score to each company or project being rated.

== History ==
The origins of socially responsible investing (SRI) may date back to the Religious Society of Friends (Quakers). In 1758, the Quaker Philadelphia Yearly Meeting prohibited members from participating in the slave trade—buying and/or selling humans.

One of the most articulate early adopters of SRI was John Wesley (1703–1791), one of the founders of Methodism. Wesley's sermon "The Use of Money" outlined his basic tenets of social investing: not to harm your neighbor through your business practices and to avoid industries like tanning and chemical production, which can harm the health of workers. Some of the best-known applications of socially responsible investing were religiously motivated. Investors would avoid "sinful" companies, such as those associated with products such as firearms, liquor, and tobacco.

The modern era of socially responsible investing evolved during the socio-political climate of the 1960s. During this time, socially concerned investors increasingly sought to address equality for women, civil rights, and labor issues. Economic development projects started or managed by Martin Luther King, such as the Montgomery bus boycott and the Operation Breadbasket Project in Chicago, established the early model for socially responsible investing efforts. King combined ongoing dialog with boycotts and direct action targeting specific corporations. Concerns about the Vietnam War were further incorporated by some social investors. An iconic image from the era was a picture in June 1972 of a naked nine-year-old girl, Phan Thị Kim Phúc, screaming and running towards a photographer, her back burning from the napalm dropped on her village. That photograph channeled particular outrage against Dow Chemical, the manufacturer of napalm, and prompted protests across the country against Dow Chemical and other companies seen as profiting from the Vietnam War.

During the 1950s and 1960s, trade unions deployed multi-employer pension fund monies for targeted investments. For example, the United Mine Workers fund invested in medical facilities, and the International Ladies' Garment Workers' Union (ILGWU) and International Brotherhood of Electrical Workers (IBEW) financed union-built housing projects. Labor unions also sought to leverage pension stocks for shareholder activism on proxy fights and shareholder resolutions. In 1978, SRI efforts by pension funds was spurred by The North will Rise Again: Pensions, Politics, and Power in the 1980s and the subsequent organizing efforts of authors Jeremy Rifkin and Randy Barber. By 1980, presidential candidates Jimmy Carter, Ronald Reagan and Jerry Brown advocated some type of social orientation for pension investments.

SRI had an important role in ending the apartheid government in South Africa. International opposition to apartheid strengthened after the 1960 Sharpeville massacre. In 1971, Reverend Leon Sullivan (at the time a board member for General Motors) drafted a code of conduct for practicing business in South Africa which became known as the Sullivan Principles. However, reports documenting the application of the Sullivan Principles said that US companies were not trying to lessen discrimination in South Africa. Due to these reports and mounting political pressure, cities, states, colleges, faith-based groups and pension funds throughout the US began divesting from companies operating in South Africa. In 1976, the United Nations imposed a mandatory arms embargo against South Africa. From the 1970s to the early 1990s, large institutions avoided investment in South Africa under apartheid. The subsequent negative flow of investment eventually forced a group of businesses, representing 75% of South African employers, to draft a charter calling for an end to apartheid. While the SRI efforts alone did not bring an end to apartheid, it did focus persuasive international pressure on the South African business community.

The mid and late 1990s saw the rise of SRI's focus on a diverse range of other issues, including tobacco stocks, mutual fund proxy disclosure, and other issues.

Since the late 1990s, SRI has become increasingly defined as a means to promote environmentally sustainable development. Many investors consider effects of global climate change a significant business and investment risk. CERES was founded in 1989 by Joan Bavaria and Dennis Hayes, coordinator of the first Earth Day, as a network for investors, environmental organizations, and other public interest groups interested in working with companies to address environmental concerns.

In 1989, representatives from the SRI industry gathered at the first SRI in the Rockies Conference to exchange ideas and gain momentum for new initiatives. The name has since changed to The SRI Conference, which meets annually at Green Building certified establishments and has attracted over 550 persons annually since 2006. This conference is produced by First Affirmative Financial Network, an investment advisory firm that works with advisors nationwide providing portfolios specialized in sustainable and responsible investing.

The first sell-side brokerage in the world to offer SRI research was the Brazilian bank Unibanco. The service was launched in January 2001 by Unibanco SRI analyst Christopher Wells from the São Paulo headquarters of the bank. It was targeted at SRI funds in Europe and the US, although it was sent to non-SRI funds both in and out of Brazil. The research was about environmental and social issues (but not governance issues) regarding companies listed in Brazil. It was sent for free to Unibanco's clients. The service lasted until mid-2002.

Drawing on the industry's experience using divestment as a tool against apartheid, the Sudan Divestment Task Force was established in 2006 in response to the genocide occurring in the Darfur region of the Sudan. Support from the US government followed with the Sudan Accountability and Divestment Act of 2007.

More recently, some social investors have sought to address the rights of indigenous peoples around the world who are affected by the business practices of various companies. The 2007 SRI Conference held a special pre-conference specifically to address the concerns of indigenous peoples. Healthy working conditions, fair wages, product safety, and equal opportunity employment also remain headline concerns for many social investors. In the mid-2010s, some funds developed gender lens investing strategies to promote workplace equity and general welfare of women and girls.

== Current strategies ==
Socially responsible investing is a growing market in both the US and Europe. In particular, it has become an important principle guiding the investment strategies of various funds and accounts. As of late 2024, ESG ETFs reached over 640 billion U.S. dollars in assets.

=== Government-controlled funds ===
Government-controlled funds such as pension funds are often very large players in the investment field, and are being pressured by the citizenry and by activist groups to adopt investment policies which encourage ethical corporate behavior, respect the rights of workers, consider environmental concerns, and avoid violations of human rights. One outstanding endorsement of such policies is The Government Pension Fund of Norway, which is mandated to avoid "investments which constitute an unacceptable risk that the Fund may contribute to unethical acts or omissions, such as violations of fundamental humanitarian principles, serious violations of human rights, gross corruption or severe environmental damages".

In the 2000s and 2010s, pension funds were under pressure to disinvest from the arms company BAE Systems, partially due to a campaign run by the Campaign Against Arms Trade (CAAT). Liverpool City Council passed a successful resolution to disinvest from the company, but a similar attempt by the Scottish Green Party in Edinburgh City Council was blocked by the Liberal Democrats.

=== Mutual funds and ETFs ===
Socially responsible mutual funds counted by the 2014 Trends Report increased in number to 415 in 2014, up from 333 in 2012, 250 in 2010, 173 in 2005 and 2007, 189 in 2003, and 167 in 2001. The overall number of mutual funds incorporating environmental, social and corporate governance (ESG) has increased four-fold since 2012. Additionally, 20 exchange-traded funds (ETFs) that incorporate ESG criteria were identified with $3.5 billion in assets at the end of 2011, an increase from the eight ETFs with $2.25 billion in net assets identified in its 2007 report—the first Trends report to track ETFs [11]. Unlike the Employee Retirement Income Security Act of 1974 (ERISA), which severely limits the extent to which socially responsible goals can be considered in managing corporate and Taft-Hartley pension assets (due to ERISA's overriding goal of protecting employees' pensions), registered investment companies can take these factors into account so long as the disclosure and other requirements of the Investment Company Act of 1940 are met. US SIF maintains charts describing the socially responsible mutual funds offered by its member firms.

Key: X = No investment; P = Positive investment; R = Restricted investment; NS = No screens.

Fund	Alcohol	Tobacco	Gambling	Defense/ Weapons	Animal Testing	Products/ Services	Environment	Human Rights	Labor Relations	Employment/ Equality	Community Investment	Proxy Voting
Access Capital Strategies Community Investment Fund	NS	NS	NS	NS	NS	NS	NS	NS	NS	NS	P	X
AHA Balanced Fund – Institutional Class	NS	X	NS	NS	NS	NS	NS	NS	NS	NS	NS	V
AHA Diversified Equity Fund – Institutional Class	NS	X	NS	NS	NS	NS	NS	NS	NS	NS	NS	V
AHA Diversified Equity Fund – N Class	NS	X	NS	NS	NS	NS	NS	NS	NS	NS	NS	V
AHA Full Maturity Fixed Income Fund – Institutional Class	NS	X	NS	NS	NS	NS	NS	NS	NS	NS	NS	V
AHA Full Maturity Fixed Income Fund – N Class	NS	X	NS	NS	NS	NS	NS	NS	NS	NS	NS	V
AHA Limited Maturity Fixed Income Fund – Institutional Class	NS	X	NS	NS	NS	NS	NS	NS	NS	NS	NS	V
AHA Limited Maturity Fixed Income Fund – N Class	NS	X	NS	NS	NS	NS	NS	NS	NS	NS	NS	V
AHA Socially Responsible Equity I	X	X	X	X	NS	P	P	P	P	P	NS	V
AHA Socially Responsible Equity N	X	X	X	X	NS	P	P	P	P	P	NS	V
Appleseed Fund	R	R	R	R	NS	NS	P	P	P	NS	P	V
Ariel Appreciation Fund	NS	X	NS	X	NS	NS	NS	NS	NS	NS	NS	V
Ariel Focus Fund	NS	X	NS	X	NS	NS	NS	NS	NS	NS	NS	V
Ariel Fund	NS	X	NS	X	NS	NS	NS	NS	NS	NS	NS	V
Azzad Ethical Income Fund	X	X	X	X	NS	NS	NS	NS	NS	NS	NS	V
Azzad Ethical Mid Cap Fund	X	X	X	X	NS	NS	NS	NS	NS	NS	NS	V
Brighter Student Fund	X	X	X	X	X	X	X	X	X	P	X	X
'Fund'	Alcohol	Tobacco	Gambling	Defense/ Weapons	Animal Testing	Products/ Services	Environment	Human Rights	Labor Relations	Employment/ Equality	Community Investment	Proxy Voting
Calvert Aggressive Allocation Fund	X	X	X	R	R	P	P	P	P	P	P	V
Calvert Capital Accumulation A	X	X	X	R	R	P	P	P	P	P	P	V
Calvert Capital Accumulation B	X	X	X	R	R	P	P	P	P	P	P	V
Calvert Capital Accumulation C	X	X	X	R	R	P	P	P	P	P	P	V
Calvert Conservative Allocation Fund	X	X	X	R	R	P	P	P	P	P	P	V
Calvert Global Alternative Energy Fund A	NS	NS	NS	NS	NS	P	P	P	P	P	NS	V
Calvert Global Water Fund	X	NS	NS	X	NS	X	NS	P	NS	NS	NS	V
Calvert International Opportunities Fund	R	R	NS	NS	NS	P	P	P	P	P	NS	V
Calvert Large Cap Growth A	X	X	X	R	R	P	P	P	P	P	P	V
Calvert Large Cap Growth B	X	X	X	R	R	P	P	P	P	P	P	V
Calvert Large Cap Growth C	X	X	X	R	R	P	P	P	P	P	P	V
Calvert Large Cap Growth I	X	X	X	R	R	P	P	P	P	P	P	V
Calvert Mid Cap Value Fund	X	X	X	R	R	P	P	P	P	P	P	V
Calvert Moderate Allocation Fund	X	X	X	R	R	P	P	P	P	P	P	V
Calvert New Vision Small Cap A	X	X	X	R	R	P	P	P	P	P	P	V
Calvert New Vision Small Cap B	X	X	X	R	R	P	P	P	P	P	P	V
Calvert New Vision Small Cap C	X	X	X	R	R	P	P	P	P	P	P	V
'Fund'	Alcohol	Tobacco	Gambling	Defense/ Weapons	Animal Testing	Products/ Services	Environment	Human Rights	Labor Relations	Employment/ Equality	Community Investment	Proxy Voting
Calvert Small Cap Value Fund	X	X	X	R	R	P	P	P	P	P	P	V
Calvert Social Index A	X	X	X	R	R	P	P	P	P	P	P	V
Calvert Social Index B	X	X	X	R	R	P	P	P	P	P	P	V
Calvert Social Index C	X	X	X	R	R	P	P	P	P	P	P	V
Calvert Social Index I	X	X	X	R	R	P	P	P	P	P	P	V
Calvert Social Investment Balanced A	X	X	X	R	R	P	P	P	P	P	P	V
Calvert Social Investment Balanced C	X	X	X	R	R	P	P	P	P	P	P	V
Calvert Social Investment Bond A	X	X	X	R	R	P	P	P	P	P	P	V
Calvert Social Investment Enhanced Equity A	X	X	X	R	R	P	P	P	P	P	P	V
Calvert Social Investment Enhanced Equity B	X	X	X	R	R	P	P	P	P	P	P	V
Calvert Social Investment Enhanced Equity C	X	X	X	R	R	P	P	P	P	P	P	V
Calvert Social Investment Equity A	X	X	X	R	R	P	P	P	P	P	P	V
Calvert Social Investment Equity C	X	X	X	R	R	P	P	P	P	P	P	V
Calvert Social Investment Equity I	X	X	X	R	R	P	P	P	P	P	P	V
Calvert World Values International A	X	X	NS	R	NS	P	P	P	P	P	P	V
Calvert World Values International C	X	X	NS	R	NS	P	P	P	P	P	P	V
CRA Qualified Investment	NS	NS	NS	NS	NS	NS	NS	NS	NS	NS	P	X
'Fund'	Alcohol	Tobacco	Gambling	Defense/ Weapons	Animal Testing	Products/ Services	Environment	Human Rights	Labor Relations	Employment/ Equality	Community Investment	Proxy Voting
Domini European PacAsia Social Equity A	X	X	X	X	NS	P	P	P	P	P	NS	V
Domini European PacAsia Social Equity I	X	X	X	X	P	P	P	P	P	P	NS	V
Domini European Social Equity A	X	X	X	X	NS	P	P	P	P	P	NS	V
Domini European Social Equity I	X	X	X	X	NS	P	P	P	P	P	NS	V
Domini Institutional Social Equity	X	X	X	X	NS	P	P	P	P	P	NS	V
Domini PacAsia Social Equity A	X	X	X	X	NS	P	P	P	P	P	NS	V
Domini PacAsia Social Equity I	X	X	X	X	NS	P	P	P	P	P	NS	V
Domini Social Bond	X	X	X	X	NS	P	P	P	P	P	P	V
Domini Social Equity A	X	X	X	X	NS	P	P	P	P	P	NS	V
Domini Social Equity I	X	X	X	X	NS	P	P	P	P	P	NS	V
Epiphany Faith and Family Values 100 Fund – A Class	R	R	R	R	NS	NS	P	P	P	P	NS	V
Epiphany Faith and Family Values 100 Fund – C Class	R	R	R	R	NS	NS	P	P	P	P	NS	V
Epiphany Faith and Family Values 100 Fund – N Class	R	R	R	R	NS	NS	P	P	P	P	NS	V
Gabelli SRI Green Fund Inc A	R	R	R	X	NS	P	P	NS	NS	NS	NS	V
Gabelli SRI Green Fund Inc AAA	R	R	R	X	NS	P	P	NS	NS	NS	NS	V
Gabelli SRI Green Fund Inc C	R	R	R	X	NS	P	P	NS	NS	NS	NS	V
Gabelli SRI Green Fund Inc I	R	R	R	X	NS	P	P	NS	NS	NS	NS	V
Green Century Balanced	NS	X	NS	R	R	P	P	NS	NS	NS	NS	V
Green Century Equity	X	X	X	R	NS	P	P	P	P	P	NS	V
Integrity Growth and Income Fund	X	X	X	NS	R	NS	P	R	R	R	NS	V
'Fund'	Alcohol	Tobacco	Gambling	Defense/ Weapons	Animal Testing	Products/ Services	Environment	Human Rights	Labor Relations	Employment/ Equality	Community Investment	Proxy Voting
Legg Mason Prt Social Awareness Fund A	NS	R	NS	R	NS	NS	P	P	P	P	NS	V
Legg Mason Prt Social Awareness Fund B	NS	R	NS	R	NS	NS	P	P	P	P	NS	V
Merrion Stockbrokers Social Awareness Fund C	NS	R	NS	R	NS	NS	P	P	P	P	NS	V
Praxis Growth Index Fund A	X	X	X	X	NS	P	P	P	P	P	P	V
Praxis Growth Index Fund I	X	X	X	X	NS	P	P	P	P	P	P	V
Praxis Impact Bond Fund A	X	X	X	X	NS	P	P	P	P	P	P	V
Praxis Impact Bond Fund I	X	X	X	X	NS	P	P	P	P	P	P	V
Praxis International Index Fund A	X	X	X	X	NS	P	P	P	P	P	P	V
Praxis International Index Fund I	X	X	X	X	NS	P	P	P	P	P	P	V
Praxis Small Cap Index Fund A	X	X	X	X	NS	P	P	P	P	P	P	V
Praxis Small Cap Index Fund I	X	X	X	X	NS	P	P	P	P	P	P	V
Praxis Value Index Fund A	X	X	X	X	NS	P	P	P	P	P	P	V
Praxis Value Index Fund I	X	X	X	X	NS	P	P	P	P	P	P	V
Neuberger Berman Socially Resp Inv	X	X	X	X	R	P	P	P	P	P	NS	V
New Alternatives Fund	X	X	X	X	X	P	P	P	P	P	P	X
'Fund'	Alcohol	Tobacco	Gambling	Defense/ Weapons	Animal Testing	Products/ Services	Environment	Human Rights	Labor Relations	Employment/ Equality	Community Investment	Proxy Voting
Parnassus Core Equity Fund	X	X	X	X	R	P	P	P	P	P	NS	V
Parnassus Fund	X	X	X	X	R	P	X	P	P	P	P	V
Parnassus Income Fixed Income	X	X	X	X	R	P	X	P	P	P	NS	V
Parnassus Mid Cap Fund	X	X	X	X	R	P	P	P	P	P	P	V
Parnassus Small Cap Fund	X	X	X	X	R	P	X	P	P	P	P	V
Parnassus Endeavor Fund	X	X	X	X	R	P	X	P	P	P	P	V
Pax World Balanced	R	X	R	R	R	P	P	P	P	P	P	V
Pax World Growth	R	X	R	R	R	P	P	P	P	P	NS	V
Pax World High Yield	R	X	R	R	R	P	P	P	P	P	P	V
Pax World Value Fund – Individual Investor	NS	X	R	X	R	P	P	P	P	P	NS	V
Pax World Value Fund – Institutional Class	NS	X	R	X	R	P	P	P	P	P	NS	V
Pax World Women's Equity Fund – Individual Investor	NS	X	R	X	R	R	R	NS	R	R	NS	V
Pax World Women's Equity Fund – Institutional Class	NS	X	R	X	R	R	R	R	R	R	NS	V
Portfolio 21	NS	X	R	R	R	P	P	R	R	R	P	V
Portfolio 21 Institutional	NS	X	R	R	R	P	P	R	R	R	NS	V
Sentinel Sustainable Core Opportunities Fund	X	X	X	R	R	P	P	P	P	P	NS	V
Sentinel Sustainable Emerging Companies Fund	X	X	X	R	R	P	P	P	P	P	NS	V
SPDR Gender Diversity Index ETF (SHE)	X	X	X	X	X	X	X	P	P	P	NS	V
TIAA-CREF	R	R	R	R	NS	P	P	P	P	P	NS	V
Flex Total Return Utilities Fund	X	X	X	X	X	P	P	NS	P	P	NS	V
Vanguard FTSE Social Index Fund	X	X	X	X	X	NS	X	X	NS	NS	NS	NS
WVH Ethical Inc. Social Balanced Fund	X	X	R	X	R	P	P	P	P	P	P	V
WVH Ethical Inc. Social Equity Fund	X	X	R	X	R	P	P	P	R	P	X	V
WVH Ethical Inc. Green Growth Fund	R	R	R	R	R	P	P	NS	NS	NS	NS	V
xRussell 3000	NS	NS	NS	NS	NS	NS	NS	NS	NS	NS	NS	X

=== Separately managed accounts ===
According to the 2014 Report on US Sustainable, Responsible and Impact Investing Trends, among separate account managers, 214 distinctive separate account vehicles or strategies, with $433 billion in assets, incorporated ESG factors into investment analysis. Where a separate account is subject to ERISA, there are legal limitations on the extent to which investment decisions can be based on factors other than maximizing plan participants' economic returns.

=== Shareholder advocacy ===
Shareholder resolutions are filed by a wide variety of institutional investors, including public pension funds, faith-based investors, socially responsible mutual funds, and labor unions. In 2004, faith-based organizations filed 129 resolutions, while socially responsible funds filed 56 resolutions.

Regulations governing shareholder resolutions vary from country to country. In the United States, they are determined primarily by the Securities and Exchange Commission, which regulates mutual funds and applies the 1940 Act and by the Department of Labor, which regulates certain plans and applies ERISA.

These regulatory regimes require pension plans and mutual funds to disclose how they voted on behalf of their investors. U.S. shareholders have organized various groups to facilitate jointly filing resolutions. These include the Council of Institutional Investors, the Interfaith Center on Corporate Responsibility, and the US SIF.

From 2012 to 2014, more than 200 US institutions and investment management firms filed or co-filed proposals. These institutions and money managers collectively controlled $1.72 trillion in assets at the end of 2013. The top categories of environmental and social issues from 2012 to 2014 were political contributions and climate change and environmental issues.

=== Community investing ===
Community investing, a subset of socially responsible investing, allows for investment directly into community-based organizations. Community investing institutions use investor capital to finance or guarantee loans to individuals and organizations that have historically been denied access to capital by traditional financial institutions. These loans are used for housing, small business creation, and education or personal development in the US and UK, or are made available to local financial institutions abroad to finance international community development. The community investing institution typically provides training and other types of support and expertise to ensure the success of the loan and its returns for investors.

Community investing grew almost 5% from 2012 to 2014. Assets held and invested locally by community development financial institutions (CDFIs) based in the US totaled $64.3 billion at the start of 2014, up from $61.4 billion in 2012.

== Investing strategies ==
=== Investing in capital markets ===
Social investors use several strategies to maximize financial return and attempt to maximize social good. These strategies seek to create change by shifting the cost of capital down for sustainable firms and up for the non-sustainable ones. The proponents argue that access to capital is what drives the future direction of development. A growing number of rating agencies collects both raw data the ESG behaviour of firms as well as aggregates this data in indices. After several years of growth, the rating agency industry has recently been subject to a consolidation phase that has reduced the number of genesis through mergers and acquisitions.

==== ESG integration ====
ESG integration is one of the most common responsible investment strategies and entails the incorporation of environmental, social and governance ("ESG") criteria into the fundamental analysis of equity investments. According to the non-profit Investor Responsibility Research Center institute (IRRCi), approaches to ESG integration vary greatly among asset managers depending on:

- Management: Who is responsible for ESG integration within the organization?
- Research: What ESG criteria and factors are being considered in the analysis?
- Application: How are the ESG criteria being applied in practice?

==== Negative screening ====
Negative screening excludes certain securities from investment consideration based on social or environmental criteria. For example, many socially responsible investors screen out tobacco company investments.

The longest-running SRI index, the Domini 400—now the MSCI KLD 400—was started in May 1990. It has continued to perform competitively —with average annualized total returns of 9.51% through December 2009 compared with 8.66% for the S&P 500.

Various academic studies have found positive, negative, and neutral associations between SRI fund orientation and financial performance.

==== Divestment ====
Divestment is the act of removing stocks from a portfolio based on mainly ethical, non-financial objections to certain business activities of a corporation. Recently, CalSTRS (California State Teachers' Retirement System) announced the removal of more than $237 million in tobacco holdings from its investment portfolio after six months of financial analysis and deliberations.

==== Shareholder activism ====
Shareholder activism efforts attempt to positively influence corporate behavior. These efforts include initiating conversations with corporate management on issues of concern, and submitting and voting proxy resolutions. These activities are undertaken with the belief that social investors, working cooperatively, can steer management on a course that will improve financial performance over time and enhance the well-being of the stockholders, customers, employees, vendors, and communities. Recent movements have also been reported of "investor relations activism", in which investor relations firms assist groups of shareholder activists in an organized push for change within a corporation. This is done typically by leveraging their enhanced knowledge of the corporation, its management (often via direct relationships), and the securities laws as a whole. Hedge funds are also major activist investors; while some pursue socially responsible investing goals, many simply are seeking to maximize fund returns. Pension plans subject to ERISA are somewhat more constrained in their ability to engage in shareholder activism or the use of plan assets to promote public policy positions; any expenditure of plan assets must be aimed at enhancing participants' retirement income.

==== Shareholder engagement ====
A less vocal subtype of shareholder activism, shareholder engagement requires extensive monitoring of the non-financial performance of all portfolio companies. In shareholder engagement dialogues, investees receive constructive feedback on how to improve ESG issues within their sphere of influence.

==== Positive investing ====
Positive investing is the new generation of socially responsible investing. It involves making investments in activities and companies believed to have a positive social impact. Positive investing suggested a broad revamping of the industry's methodology for driving change through investments. Positive investing goes beyond traditional socially responsible investing by not only avoiding harmful industries, but actively seeking out and supporting companies and projects that create measurable positive social and environmental impacts. This approach includes investments in areas such as renewable energy (e.g., solar and wind power projects), affordable housing developments, education technology startups, healthcare innovations, and sustainable agriculture initiatives. These investments aim to generate both financial returns and tangible benefits for society and the environment. This investment approach allows investors to positively express their values on corporate behavior issues such as social justice and the environment through stock selection – without sacrificing portfolio diversification or long-term performance. Positive screening pushes the idea of sustainability, not just in the narrow environmental or humanitarian sense, but also in the sense of a company's long-term potential to compete and succeed. In 2015, Morgan Stanley conducted a review of 10,000 funds and concluded "strong sustainability" investments outperformed weak sustainability investments, tackling the idea of a trade-off between positive impact and financial return. while the Global Impact Investing Network's 2015 report on benchmarks and returns in impact investing in private equity and venture capital found market-rate or market-beating returns were common in impact investments.

==== Impact investing ====
Impact investing is the alternative investment (i.e. private equity) approach to positive investing. In 2014, the UK's presidency of the G8 created a Social Impact Investment Task Force which produced a series of reports that defined impact investing as "those that intentionally target specific social objectives along with a financial return and measure the achievement of both". Impact investing capitalizes businesses that potentially provide social or environmental impact at a scale that purely philanthropic interventions usually cannot reach. This capital may be in a range of forms including private equity, debt, working capital lines of credit, and loan guarantees. Examples in recent decades include many investments in microfinance, community development finance, and clean technology. Impacting investing has its roots in the venture capital community, and an investor will often take an active role mentoring or leading the growth of the company or start-up.

=== Community investment ===
By investing directly in an institution, rather than purchasing stock, an investor is able to create a greater social impact: money spent purchasing stock in the secondary market accrues to the stock's previous owner and may not generate social good, while money invested in a community institution is put to work. For example, money invested in a Community Development Financial Institution may be used by that institution to alleviate poverty or inequality, spread access to capital to under-served communities, support economic development or green business, or create other social good. In 1984, Trillium Asset Management's founder, Joan Bavaria, invited Chuck Matthei of the Institute for Community Economics (ICE), an organization that helps communities create and sustain land trusts, to a meeting of US SIF. It is likely that this was the first time a nonprofit organization with a loan fund would meet directly with SRI managers. Trillium clients began investing in ICE later that year.

== Global context ==
Socially responsible investing is a global phenomenon. With the international scope of business itself, social investors frequently invest in companies with international operations. As international investment products and opportunities have expanded, so have international SRI products. The ranks of social investors are growing throughout developed and developing countries. In 2006, the United Nations Environment Programme launched its Principles for Responsible Investment which provide a framework for investors to incorporate environmental, social, and governance (ESG) factors into the investment process. PRI has more than 1,500 signatories managing more than US$60 trillion of assets.

The Global Sustainable Investment Alliance (GSIA) is a collaboration of membership-based sustainable investment organisations around the world including the European Sustainable Investment Forum (Eurosif), UK Sustainable Investment and Finance Association (UKSIF), the Responsible Investment Association Australasia (RIAA), Responsible Investment Association (RIA Canada), the Forum for Sustainable and Responsible Investment (US SIF), Dutch Association of Investors for Sustainable Development (VBDO) and Japan Sustainable Investment Forum. The GSIA's mission is to deepen the impact and visibility of sustainable investment organizations at the global level.

The Global Sustainable Investment Review 2018, the fourth edition of this biennial report, continues to be the only report collating results from the market studies of regional sustainable investment forums from Europe, the United States, Japan, Canada, and Australia and New Zealand. It provides a snapshot of sustainable investing in these markets at the start of 2018 by drawing on the in-depth regional and national reports from GSIA members: Eurosif, Japan Sustainable Investment Forum (JSIF), Responsible Investment Association Australasia, RIA Canada and US SIF. This report also includes data on the African sustainable investing market, from the African Investing for Impact Barometer, and on Latin America from the Principles for Responsible Investment.

The 2018 report shows that globally, sustainable investing assets in the five major markets stood at US$30.7 trillion at the start of 2018, a 34% increase in two years. From 2016 to 2018, the fastest growing region has been Japan, followed by Australia/New Zealand and Canada. These were also the three fastest growing regions in the previous two-year period. The largest three regions— based on the value of their sustainable investing assets—were Europe, the United States and Japan.

A 2020 global analysis from Morningstar indicates that assets in sustainable funds reached nearly, $1.7 trillion. Net flows into U.S. sustainable funds surpassed $51 billion.

== ESG ratings agencies ==
Asset managers and other financial institutions increasingly rely on ESG ratings agencies to assess, measure and compare companies' ESG performance. Sustainalytics, RepRisk are two examples of dedicated ESG ratings agencies, while global credit agencies like S&P Global are also seeing the value to adding ESG ratings to their data offerings.

== Responsible, ethical and impact investing in Australia ==
According to the Responsible Investment Association Australasia's annual Responsible Investment Benchmark Report Australia 2020, in 2019 and for a 19th consecutive year, funds managed under responsible investment approaches grew as a proportion of total professionally managed investments in Australia to AU$1,149 billion in assets under management, a rise of 17% from 2018. Ever more investment managers are applying a range of responsible investing approaches – from ESG integration and negative screening to sustainability-themed and impact investing.

The report shows that in Australian and multi-sector responsible investment funds outperformed mainstream funds over 1, 3, 5 and 10 year time horizons.

Australian responsible investment managers still favour ESG integration and corporate engagement and voting above negative and norms-based screening as their primary responsible investment approaches for constructing portfolios, but managers are increasingly driving capital towards sustainability-themed and impact investing allocations with allocations to Green, Social and Sustainability Bonds more than doubling since last year.

Negative screening of fossil fuels by the responsible investment industry is beginning to catch up to consumer interest. In 2018, only 5% of responsible investment AUM for survey respondents who conduct negative screening was screened for fossil fuels. In 2019, 19% of responsible investment AUM has been screened for fossil fuels, growing 14 percentage points from the year before. For consumers using RIAA's Responsible Returns search and compare tool for ethical investments, the most important exclusionary screens are fossil fuels, human rights abuses and armaments.

== Responsible, ethical and impact investing in New Zealand ==
The Responsible Investment Association Australasia's annual Responsible Investment Benchmark Report New Zealand 2020 details the size, growth, depth and performance of the New Zealand responsible investment market over 12 months to 31 December 2019 and compares these results with the broader New Zealand financial market. In 2019, funds managed under responsible investment approaches grew as a proportion of total professionally managed investments in New Zealand to NZ$153.5 billion in 2019. This represents 52% of the estimated NZ$296 billion of total professionally managed assets under management in New Zealand.

Increasingly, responsible investors in New Zealand have shifted their focus from screening out harmful industries such as tobacco and armaments, to considering broader environmental, social and corporate governance (ESG) factors when investing. Impact investing has grown over 13 times from NZ$358 million in 2018 to NZ$4.74 billion in 2019. Green, Social and Sustainability (GSS) Bonds account for 88% of products using this approach.

== Ethical investment in the UK ==
In 1985, Friends Provident launched the first ethically screened investment fund with criteria which excluded tobacco, arms, alcohol and oppressive regimes. Since 1985, over 90 investment funds have launched offering a wide range of investment criteria; both negatively screened and with positive investment criteria i.e. investing into companies involved in promoting sustainability.

Since 1985, most of the major investment organizations have launched ethical and socially responsible funds, although this has led to a great deal of discussion and debate over the use of the term "ethical" investment. This is because each of the fund management organizations tend to apply a slightly different approach to running their funds.

In recent years, there has been growth in the market for high social impact investments; this is a style of investing where the businesses receiving investment have social or environmental goals as a primary purpose.

UK institutions are also getting more involved in social investing through impact investing funds, with those such as Deutsche Bank and NESTA, alongside other institutions such as Big Issue Invest, which is part of The Big Issue group.

As of June 2014, EIRIS estimated that there was over £13.5 billion invested in Britain's green and ethical retail funds. This estimate is based on around 85 UK domiciled green or ethical retail funds and it seeks to not include UK money invested in ethical funds domiciled outside of the UK.

== In higher education ==
In 2007, the Dwight Hall organization at Yale University launched the first undergraduate-run socially responsible investment fund in the United States, known as the Dwight Hall Socially Responsible Investment Fund.

In 2013, the University of Edinburgh adopted a comprehensive responsible investment policy, making it one of the first universities in the United Kingdom to do so. The policy includes divestment from fossil fuels and increased investment in renewable energy and sustainable technologies.

== Comparison with conventional investing ==
While conventional investing only focuses on the traditional risk and returns considerations in making investment decisions, socially responsible investing considers other ethical factors as discussed above. Hence, the question often arise as to whether it pays financially to be ethical or not in making investment decisions. The debate as to whether there is anything to gain or lose by deciding to be ethical and socially responsible in making investment decisions is still ongoing. Several studies have found that there is no conclusive evidence as to whether the performances of socially responsible investments outperform those of conventional and vice versa.

=== Comparing portfolio and fund performance ===
Several studies in various places have analysed the performance of socially responsible investing (SRI) and conventional investing (CI) using different models and methodologies for measuring performance. Using the Carhart four-factor model, found that an approach where stocks with high SRI scores are bought while those with low SRI scores are sold off produced a positive abnormal performance of up to 8.7% per annum, suggesting that investors can achieve their ethical goals without hurting their financial performance. also using the Carhart four-factor model, noted an excess return of 7% for environmentally-friendly firms. However, using a similar approach found the performance of SRI stocks to be not statistically different from those of conventional stocks. In contrast, also using the Carhart four-factor model found a portfolio which included "sin stocks" (alcohol, tobacco, gaming) to be significantly outperforming similar comparable stocks, which indicates that investors in SRI stocks might be losing. However, after controlling for managerial skills, transaction costs and fees, found no outperformance between portfolios which include "sin" stocks and comparable SR portfolios. Some other studies have compared the performance of SRI funds with conventional funds. While some studies used only the capital asset pricing model to compare performance), others used multifactor models such as the Fama–French three-factor model and Carhart four-factor model. These studies found no statistically significant difference in performance between the SRI and conventional funds.

=== Comparing stock market index performance ===
Considering that difference in performance of funds may be due to portfolio selection/construction process and/or the ability of fund managers and not necessarily on the nature of investments themselves, some studies have compared the performance of stock market indices instead. Two of the pioneer studies compared the performance of the Domini 400 Social Index with the S&P 500. The Sharpe ratio and the capital asset pricing model were used to estimate Jensen's alpha for the comparison and no significant difference was found in the performance of the two indices. A follow-up study compared the performance of four SRI indices (Domini 400 Social Index, Calvert Social Index, Citizen's Index and Dow Jones Sustainability Indices US Index) with the S&P 500 index between 1990 and 2004 and found that returns on the SRI indices exceeded returns on S&P 500 even though they were not statistically significant. Others focused only on the US and on outside the US by studying the performance of 29 SRI indices globally. Using the capital asset pricing model to estimate Jensen's alpha as the performance indicator, no significant evidence of under/over performance was found. A comparison of the performance of SR indices with conventional indices on a global scale using marginal conditional stochastic dominance found there is "strong evidence that there is a financial price to be paid for socially responsible investing".

A more recent study showed that "improvements in CSR reputation enhance profits".

== See also ==
- Blended value – Conceptual framework
- Business ethics – Application of ethical principles to the area of business activities
- Community wind energy – Local ratepayer-owned air current power
- Corporate social responsibility – Form of corporate self-regulation aimed at contributing to social or charitable goals
- Climate-related asset stranding – Former physical asset, now a liability
- Development impact bond
- Disinvestment – Concerted economic boycott to pressure a change in policy
- Eco-investing – Investment strategy
- Environmental, social and corporate governance – Business framework
- Ethical banking – Bank concerned with the social and environmental impacts of its investments and loans
- Fossil fuel divestment – Divestment in companies that extract fossil fuels
- Integrated reporting – Framework for communicating an organization's value creation
- Impact investing – Investing for socio-environmental impact and profit
- Microfinance – Provision of microloans to small scale entrepreneurs and small businesses
- Philanthrocapitalism – Method of philanthropy that mirrors a for-profit business
- Sharia investments – Financial products and services that conform to Sharia (Islamic law)
- Social finance – Mobilising capital for projects with social or environmental goals
- Social impact bond – Bond repaying investment based on social outcomes
- Social responsibility – Ethical framework
- Sustainable development – Mode of human development
- Sustainable finance – Finance with an environmental objective
- Terror-free investing
- Vice Fund
