= Christians for Fair Witness on the Middle East =

Christians for Fair Witness on the Middle East is a Christian organization working to correct bias against Israel in the North American Christian community.

National Director Sr. Ruth Lautt, OP, Esq., told a reporter that she believes that the "one-sided, unbalanced approach" on the Middle East taken by many mainline churches is the result of "shallow understanding" of the Arab-Israel conflict. In 2008, Fair Witness worked with members of the United Methodist Church to stop the denomination from divesting from its investments in Israeli companies.
