= Disinvestment from South Africa =

Economic boycott against apartheid South Africa

The campaign to divest from South Africa gained prominence on university campuses in the United States in the mid-1980s; the debate headlined the October 1985 issue of Vassar College's student newspaper. The man pictured with his index finger raised is then-South African president P.W. Botha.

Disinvestment from South Africa was first advocated in the late 1960s in protest against South Africa's system of apartheid, but was not implemented on a significant scale until the mid-1980s. A disinvestment policy the U.S. adopted in 1986 in response to the disinvestment campaign is credited with playing a role in pressuring the South African government to embark on negotiations in the early 1990s that ultimately led to the dismantling of the apartheid system.

== United Nations resolutions and embargos ==
In November 1962, the United Nations General Assembly passed Resolution 1761, a non-binding resolution establishing the United Nations Special Committee against Apartheid, and called for imposing economic and other sanctions on South Africa. Western nations and major trading partners of South Africa opposed the call for sanctions and boycotted the committee.

Following the passage of this resolution, the UK-based Anti-Apartheid Movement (AAM) spearheaded the arrangements for an international conference on sanctions to be held in London in April 1964. According to Arianna Lisson,

The aim of the Conference was to work out the practicability of economic sanctions and their implications on the economies of South Africa, the UK, the U.S., and the Protectorates. Knowing that the strongest opposition to the application of sanctions came from the West (and within the West, Britain), the Committee made every effort to attract as wide and varied a number of speakers and participants as possible so that the Conference findings would be regarded as objective.

According to Lisson, the International Conference for Economic Sanctions Against South Africa

established the necessity, the legality, and the practicability of internationally organised sanctions against South Africa, whose policies were seen to have become a direct threat to peace and security in Africa and the world. Its findings also pointed out that in order to be effective, a programme of sanctions would need the active participation of Britain and the U.S., who were also the main obstacle to the implementation of such a policy.

=== The British response ===
The conference was not successful in persuading Britain to take up economic sanctions against South Africa. Rather, the British government

remained firm in its view that the imposition of sanctions would be unconstitutional "because we do not accept that this situation in South Africa constitutes a threat to international peace and security and we do not, in any case, believe that sanctions would have the effect of persuading the South African Government to change its policies".

The AAM tried to make sanctions an issue in the 1964 general election in Britain. Candidates were asked to state their position on economic sanctions and other punitive measures against the South African government. Most candidates who responded said they supported sanctions. However, after the Labour Party swept to power, commitment to the anti-apartheid cause dissipated. In short order, Labour Party leader Harold Wilson told the press that his party was "not in favour of trade sanctions partly because, even if fully effective, they would harm the people we are most concerned about – the Africans and those white South Africans who are having to maintain some standard of decency there". Even so, Lisson writes that the "AAM still hoped that the new Labour Government would be more sensitive to the demands of public opinion than the previous Government." But by the end of 1964 it was clear that the election of the Labour Party had made little difference in the government's overall unwillingness to impose sanctions. Lisson summarized the situation at the UN in 1964:

At the UN, Britain consistently refused to accept that the situation in South Africa fell under Chapter VII of the [United Nations] Charter. Instead, in collaboration with the U.S., it worked for a carefully worded appeal on the Rivonia and other political trials to try to appease Afro-Asian countries and public opinion at home and abroad; by early 1965 the issue of sanctions had lost momentum.

According to Lisson, Great Britain rejected sanctions because of its economic interests in South Africa, which would have been put at risk if any type of meaningful economic sanctions had been put in place.

=== United Nations embargos ===
In 1977, the voluntary UN arms embargo became mandatory with the passing of United Nations Security Council Resolution 418. On 20 November 1987 the United Nations General Assembly adopted a voluntary international oil embargo.

== United States campaign (1977–1989) ==
=== The Sullivan Principles (1977) ===
When anti-apartheid activists in the U.S. found that Washington was unwilling to get involved in economically isolating South Africa, they responded by lobbying individual business and institutional investors to end their involvement with or investments in the apartheid state as a matter of corporate social responsibility. This campaign was coordinated by several faith-based institutional investors, who eventually came together to form the Interfaith Center on Corporate Responsibility. An array of celebrities, including singer Paul Simon, also participated.

Part of this campaign centered around the so-called Sullivan Principles, authored by and named after the Rev. Dr. Leon Sullivan. Leon Sullivan was an African-American preacher in Philadelphia who in 1977 was also a board member of the corporate giant General Motors. At that time General Motors was the largest employer of black people in South Africa. The principles required that, as a condition of doing business, the corporation ensure that all employees be treated equally regardless of race and in an integrated environment. These principles directly conflicted with the mandated racial discrimination and segregation policies of apartheid-era South Africa.

While part of the anti-apartheid movement lobbied individual businesses to adopt and comply with the Sullivan Principles, the movement opened an additional front with institutional investors. Besides advocating that institutional investors withdraw any direct investments in South Africa-based companies, anti-apartheid activists also lobbied for the divestment from all U.S.-based companies having South African interests that had not yet adopted the Sullivan Principles. Institutional investors such as public pension funds were the most susceptible to these lobbying efforts.

Public companies with South African interests were confronted on two levels. First, concerned stockholders submitted shareholder resolutions (which were routinely rejected due to management proxy votes), and they could affect corporate reputations. Second, the companies were presented with a significant financial threat if major institutional investors decided to withdraw their investments.

=== Achieving critical mass (1984–1989) ===
The disinvestment campaign in the United States, which had been in existence for two decades, gained a critical mass following the black political resistance to the 1983 South African constitution, a document that further solidified the system of racial segregation and discrimination. Richard Knight writes:

In a total rejection of apartheid, black South Africans mobilized to make the townships ungovernable, black local officials resigned in droves, and the government declared a State of Emergency in 1985 and used thousands of troops to quell "unrest". Television audiences throughout the world were to watch almost nightly reports of massive resistance to apartheid, the growth of a democratic movement, and the savage police and military response.

The result of the widely televised South African response was "a dramatic expansion of international actions to isolate apartheid, actions that combined with the internal situation to force dramatic changes in South Africa's international economic relations".

=== Higher education endowments ===
Student anti-apartheid activists in the US demanded that their colleges and universities divest from companies that traded or had operations in South Africa. At many universities, students and faculty pressured the board of trustees to take action on the issue. The first anti-apartheid organization on university campuses in the United States was CUAA, founded by Ramon Sevilla at the University of California, Berkeley. Sevilla had support from Nelson Mandela, with whom he was in communication while Mandela was imprisoned on Robben Island, and he was also in contact with the African National Congress (ANC).

Some of the most effective actions in support of divestment from South Africa took place in the years 1976–1985. Sevilla travelled throughout the US and Europe gathering support for sanctions against South Africa, and he led a successful effort to force the University of California to divest all of its investments in companies doing business in South Africa. In an anti-apartheid protest in April 1986, 61 students were arrested after building a shantytown in front of the chancellor's office at UC Berkeley. At Occidental College in Los Angeles, future US president Barack Obama was one of the divestment activists.

As a result of these organised divestment campaigns, the boards of trustees of several colleges and universities voted to divest completely from companies with major South African interests. The first of these was Hampshire College in 1977.

These initial successes set a pattern that was later repeated at other campuses across the country. Activism surged in 1984 on the wave of public interest created by the wide television coverage of resistance efforts of black South Africans. According to Knight's analysis, over the next few years the number of educational institutions fully or partially divesting from South Africa increased as follows:

	1984	1987	1988
Number of institutions divesting	53	128	155

==== Michigan State University ====
The disinvestment campaign on campuses began in 1977 at Michigan State University and Stanford University. It had some early successes in 1978 at Michigan State University, Columbia University, and the University of Wisconsin–Madison. Following the Michigan State University divestiture in 1978, the Michigan State Legislature in 1982 voted for divestiture by all of Michigan's public colleges and universities, an action later struck down as unconstitutional by the Michigan Court of Appeals in response to a suit against the Act by the University of Michigan.

==== Columbia University ====
The initial Columbia divestment focused largely on bonds and financial institutions directly involved with the South African regime. It followed a year-long campaign initiated by students who in 1977 had worked together to block the appointment of former Secretary of State Henry Kissinger to an endowed chair at Columbia. Broadly backed by a diverse array of student groups and many notable faculty members, the Committee Against Investment in South Africa held numerous teach-ins and demonstrations focused on the trustees' ties to the corporations doing business with South Africa. Trustee meetings were picketed and interrupted by demonstrations, culminating in the May 1978 takeover of the Graduate School of Business.

==== Smith College ====
Smith College, in Northampton, Massachusetts, which is connected to Hampshire College in Amherst, Massachusetts, through the Five College Consortium, took up the issue of South African investments several years later. In the spring semester of 1986 students at Smith protested the Board of Trustees' decision not to fully divest. Student protests included a sit-in in the main administrative offices on 24 February 1986. The next day students blockaded the building, preventing staff from entering. The students expected to be arrested, but the college president at the time, Mary Maples Dunn, refused to have the students arrested.

A comprehensive list of the students' demands was published on 28 February 1986. The "Women at College Hall" agreed to end the blockade if the Board of Trustees agreed to "issue a statement of intent to deliberate again, with a quorum, the issue of divestment" before Spring Break, and to consider "a restructuring of the investment policy". Students also demanded that a teach-in be conducted to educate the college and the Board of Trustees on divestment and South African apartheid.

On 1 March 1986, the protest ended when administrators agreed that the trustees would re-evaluate their decision, a mandatory teach-in would be held, and amnesty would be granted to anyone involved in the sit-in and blockade. As a result of student pressure, by 31 October 1988 Smith College had divested all $39 million in stocks that they held in companies working in South Africa.

==== Harvard University ====
Harvard University undertook only a partial divestment from South Africa and only after significant pressure. Adam Sofen and Alan Wirzbicki give this description:

Throughout the 1980s, Harvard professors for the most part avoided involvement with South Africa in protest of apartheid, and then president Derek C. Bok was a vocal supporter of work by the U.S. to prompt reform in South Africa. But the University was slow to pull its own investments out of companies doing business in South Africa, insisting that through its proxy votes, it could more effectively fight apartheid than by purging stocks from its portfolio. But after a decade of protests, Harvard did adopt a policy of selective divestment, and by the end of the 1980s was almost completely out of South Africa.

==== University of California ====
At the University of California Berkeley campus, student organizations conducted a campaign of civil disobedience, with 38 students arrested in 1984, a semester-long sit-in with 158 arrests in 1985, and a shantytown protest on 1–4 April 1986 that resulted in a violent confrontation between protesters and police and 152 arrests.

In contrast to the limited action undertaken by Harvard, in 1986 the University of California authorized the withdrawal of three billion dollars' worth of investments from the apartheid state. Nelson Mandela remarked that the University of California's massive divestment was particularly significant in pressuring for an end to white-minority rule in South Africa.

==== Gettysburg College ====
In 1989, after a three-year review by the Gettysburg College Board of Trustees and a five-month campaign by the Salaam Committee—a campus group made up of students and faculty—the college divested $5.4 million from companies connected to South Africa.

=== States and cities ===
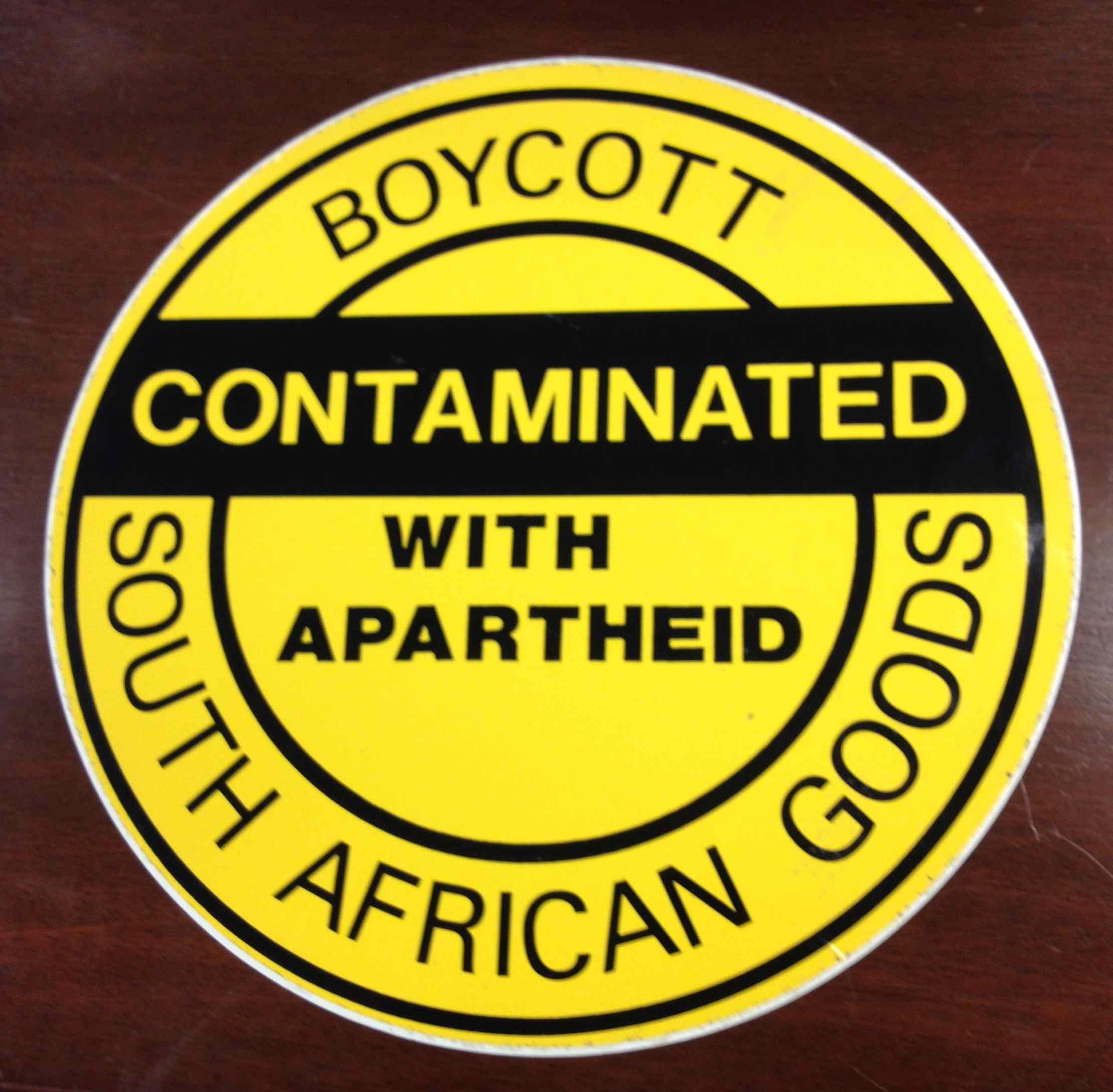
A boycott South Africa sticker now housed at the Library of Congress in Washington, D.C.

In addition to college and university campuses, anti-apartheid activists found support in city councils and state legislatures. Several states and localities passed legislation ordering the sale of South Africa-related securities. On 5 June 1978 the City and County of San Francisco passed legislation requiring them not to invest "in corporations and banks doing business in or with South Africa". By the end of 1989, "26 states, 22 counties and over 90 cities had taken some form of binding economic action against companies doing business in South Africa". Many public pension funds connected to these local governments were required to divest. These local governments also exerted pressure by enacting selective purchasing policies, "whereby cities give preference in bidding on contracts for goods and services to those companies who do not do business in South Africa".

==== Nebraska ====
Nebraska was the first U.S. state to divest from South Africa. The divestment was initiated by Ernie Chambers, the only black member of the Nebraska legislature. Chambers was angered when he learned that the University of Nebraska–Lincoln had accepted a donation of several hundred gold Krugerrands. He introduced a nonbinding resolution calling for state pension funds that had been invested directly or indirectly in South Africa to be invested elsewhere. It became state law in 1980.

According to Knight, the early divestment in Nebraska caused little immediate change in business practices; David Packard of Hewlett-Packard stated "I'd rather lose business in Nebraska than with South Africa." The impact was magnified when other U.S. state governments adopted similar measures through the 1980s. Nebraska passed stronger legislation in 1984, mandating divestment of all funds from companies doing business in South Africa. This resulted in the divestment of $14.6 million in stocks from Nebraska's public employee pension funds.

=== Federal involvement ===
The activity at the state and city level set the stage for action by the U.S. federal government.

==== Comprehensive Anti-Apartheid Act ====
The Comprehensive Anti-Apartheid Act of 1986 was introduced by Congressman Ronald Dellums, supported by the members of the Congressional Black Caucus in the House of Representatives, and piloted through the House by Congressman Howard Wolpe, chairman of the House Africa Subcommittee. President Ronald Reagan responded by using his veto, but surprisingly, and in testament to the strength of the anti-apartheid movement, the Republican-controlled Senate overrode his veto. Knight gives this description of the act:

The Act banned new U.S. investment in South Africa, sales to the police and military, and new bank loans, except for the purpose of trade. Specific measures against trade included the prohibition of the import of agricultural goods, textiles, shellfish, steel, iron, uranium, and the products of state-owned corporations.

The results of the Act were mixed in economic terms, according to Knight: Between 1985 and 1987, U.S. imports from South Africa declined by 35%, but the trend reversed in 1988 when imports increased by 15%. Knight, citing a 1989 study by the General Accounting Office, attributes some of the increase in imports in 1988 to lax enforcement of the 1986 Act. He writes that a "major weakness of the Act is that it does little to prohibit exports to South Africa, even in such areas as computers and other capital goods".

==== Budget Reconciliation Act ====
A second federal measure, introduced by Representative Charles Rangel in 1987 as an amendment to the Budget Reconciliation Act, removed the ability of U.S. corporations to obtain tax reimbursements for taxes paid in South Africa. The result was that U.S. corporations operating in South Africa were subject to double taxation. According to Knight:

The sums of money involved are large. According to the Internal Revenue Service, taxes involved in 1982 were $211,593,000 on taxable income of $440,780,000. The U.S. Chamber of Commerce in South Africa has estimated that the measure increases the tax bill for U.S. companies from 57.5% to 72% of profits in South Africa.

==== Further legislative efforts ====
An additional and much harsher sanctions bill was passed by the House of Representatives in August 1988. This bill mandated "the withdrawal of all U.S. companies from South Africa, the sale by U.S. residents of all investments in South African companies and an end to most trade, except for the import of certain strategic minerals". In the end, the bill did not become law, as it was not able to pass the Senate. Even so, the fact that such a harsh bill made any progress at all through Congress "alerted both the South African government and U.S. business that significant further sanctions were likely to be forthcoming" if the political situation in South Africa remained unchanged.

== Effects on South Africa ==
=== Economic effects ===
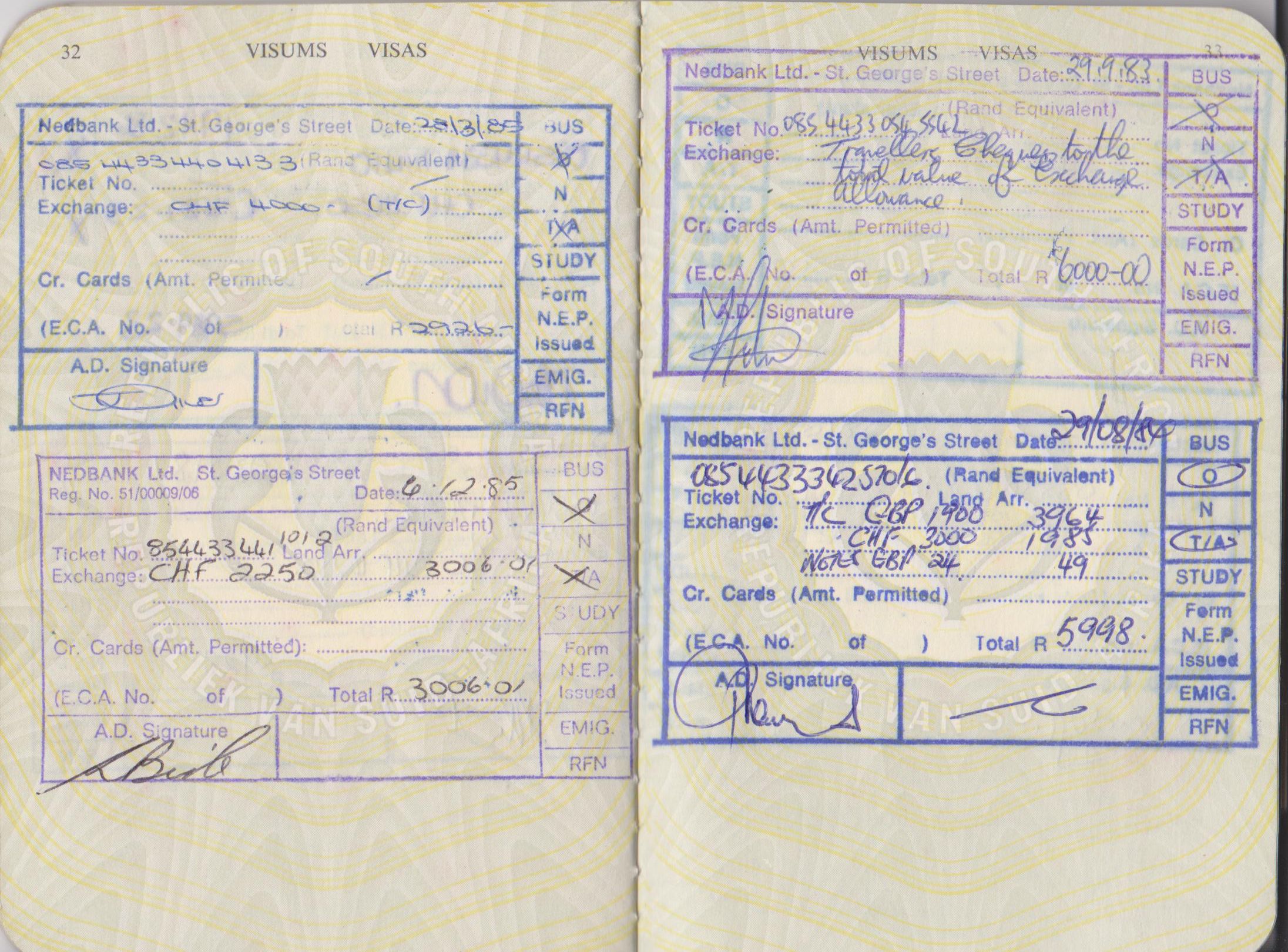
Four exchange control stamps in a South African passport from the mid-1980s allowing the passport holder to take a particular amount of currency out of the country. Exchange controls such as these were imposed by the South African government to restrict the outflow of capital from the country.

While post-colonial countries in Africa had been the first to impose sanctions on South Africa, these measures had little effect because of the relatively small economies of those countries. The disinvestment campaign impacted South Africa only after the major Western nations, including the United States, got involved beginning in mid-1984. From 1984 onwards, South Africa experienced considerable capital flight because of disinvestment and the repayment of foreign loans. The net capital movement out of South Africa was:

- R9.2 billion in 1985
- R6.1 billion in 1986
- R3.1 billion in 1987
- R5.5 billion in 1988

The capital flight triggered a dramatic decline in the international exchange rate of the South African rand. The currency decline made imports more expensive, and this in turn caused inflation in South Africa to rise at a steep 12–15% per year.

The South African government attempted to restrict the damaging outflow of capital. Knight writes that "in September 1985 it imposed a system of exchange control and a debt repayments standstill. Under exchange control, South African residents are generally prohibited from removing capital from the country and foreign investors can only remove investments via the financial rand, which is traded at a 20% to 40% discount compared to the commercial rand. This means companies that disinvest get significantly fewer dollars for the capital they withdraw."

== Criticism of disinvestment ==
Within South Africa there was opposition to disinvestment among both black and white political leaders. Mangosuthu Buthelezi, Chief Minister of KwaZulu and president of the Inkatha Freedom Party, slammed sanctions, stating that "They can only harm all the people of Southern Africa. They can only lead to more hardships, particularly for the blacks." The Members of Parliament Helen Suzman and Harry Schwarz, who opposed apartheid and were leaders of the Progressive Federal Party, also argued that disinvestment would cause further economic hardships for black people and that this would ultimately worsen the political climate for negotiations. Suzman said that such sanctions are "self-defeating, wrecking the economy and do not assist anybody irrespective of race". Schwarz said, "Morality is cheap when someone else is paying."

Many politicians outside of South Africa also criticised disinvestment because of its economic impact on black South Africans. British Prime Minister Margaret Thatcher described sanctions and disinvestment as "the way of poverty, starvation and destroying the hopes of the very people – all of them – whom you wish to help." John Major, at that time her Foreign Secretary, said disinvestment would "feed white consciences outside South Africa, not black bellies within it", although much later, in 2013, he said that the Conservative government led by Margaret Thatcher had been wrong to oppose tougher sanctions against South Africa during the apartheid era.

Many conservatives opposed the disinvestment campaign, accusing its advocates of hypocrisy for not also proposing that the same sanctions be levelled on either the Soviet Union or the People's Republic of China.

Murray Rothbard, a libertarian economist, also opposed this policy, asserting that the most direct adverse impact of the boycott would be felt by the black workers in that country, and that the best way to remedy the problem of apartheid was by promoting trade and the growth of free market capitalism in South Africa.

Ronald Reagan, who was the U.S. President during the time the disinvestment movement was at its peak, also opposed it, instead favouring a policy of "constructive engagement" with the Pretoria government.

== See also ==
- Anti-Apartheid Movement
- Anti-Apartheid movement in the United States
- Academic boycotts of South Africa
- Boycott, Divestment and Sanctions
- Disinvestment
- Economic history of South Africa
- International sanctions during apartheid
- Socially responsible investing
- Disinvestment from Israel
