= GSIA =

GSIA may refer to:

- Global Sustainable Investment Alliance, an organization promoting sustainable investments
- Graduate School of Industrial Administration, a business school of Carnegie Mellon University in Pittsburgh, Pennsylvania
