= Divestment =

Reduction of an asset by a business

In finance and economics, divestment or divestiture is the reduction of some kind of asset for financial, ethical, or political objectives or sale of an existing business by a firm. A divestment is the opposite of an investment. Divestiture is an adaptive change and adjustment of a company's ownership and business portfolio made to confront with internal and external changes.

== Motives ==
Firms may have several motives for divestitures:

1. a firm may divest (sell) businesses that are not part of its core operations so that it can focus on what it does best. For example, Eastman Kodak, Ford Motor Company, Future Group and many other firms have sold various businesses that were not closely related to their core businesses.
2. to obtain funds. Divestitures generate funds for the firm because it is selling one of its businesses in exchange for cash. For example, CSX Corporation made divestitures to focus on its core railroad business and also to obtain funds so that it could pay off some of its existing debt.
3. a firm's "break-up" value is sometimes believed to be greater than the value of the firm as a whole. In other words, the sum of a firm's individual asset liquidation values exceeds the market value of the firm's combined assets. This encourages firms to sell off what would be worth more when liquidated than when retained.
4. divesting a part of a firm may enhance stability. Philips, for example, divested its chip division—NXP—because the chip market was so volatile and unpredictable that NXP was responsible for the majority of Philips's stock fluctuations while it represented only a very small part of Philips NV.
5. divesting a part of a company may eliminate a division which is under-performing or even failing.
6. regulatory authorities may demand divestiture, for example in order to create competition.
7. pressure from shareholders for social reasons (sometimes also called disinvestment). Examples include disinvestment from South Africa in the former era of apartheid (now ended), disinvestment from Israel due to the occupation of the Palestinian territories, disinvestment from Russia due to the 2022 Russian invasion of Ukraine and calls for fossil fuel divestment in response to climate change.

=== Divestment for financial goals ===
Often the term is used as a means to grow financially in which a company sells off a business unit in order to focus their resources on a market it judges to be more profitable, or promising. Sometimes, such an action can be a spin-off. In the United States, divestment of certain parts of a company can occur when required by the Federal Trade Commission before a merger with another firm is approved. A company can divest assets to wholly owned subsidiaries.

It is a process of selling an asset. The largest corporate divestiture in history was the 1984 U.S. Department of Justice-mandated breakup of the Bell System into AT&T and the seven Baby Bells.

Of the 1000 largest global companies, those that are actively involved in both acquiring and divesting create as much as 1.5 to 4.7 percentage points higher shareholder returns than those primarily focused on acquisitions.

=== Divestment for social goals ===
Examples of divestment for social goals include:

- Disinvestment from Israel, a movement by critics of Israel (since 1920s)
- Disinvestment from South Africa in the former era of apartheid (1960s–1990s)
- Tobacco industry divestment, coordinated by the NGO Tobacco-Free Portfolios (since 2000s)
- Fossil fuel divestment in response to global warming, coordinated by the NGO 350.org (since 2010s)
- Factory farming divestment and big livestock divestment in response to environmental destruction, animal suffering, and human health concerns, coordinated by NGO Feedback Global.

== Method of divestment ==
Some firms are using technology to facilitate the process of divesting some divisions. They post the information about any division that they wish to sell on their website so that it is available to any firm that may be interested in buying the division. For example, Alcoa has established an online showroom of the divisions that are for sale. By communicating the information online, Alcoa has reduced its hotel, travel, and meeting expenses.

Firms use transitional service agreements to increase the strategic benefits of divestitures.

Divestment execution includes five critical work streams: governance, tax, carve-out financial statements, deal-basis information, and operational separation. Companies often create cross-disciplined teams composed of IT, HR, legal, tax, and other key business units, to implement a business separation.

With economic liberalization of the Indian economy, India's Ministry of Finance set up a separate Department of Disinvestments.

== See also ==
- Mergers and acquisitions – Processes through which companies combine or transfer ownership
- Corporate spin-off – Action where a company splits off part as a separate entity
- Consolidation (business) – Merger and acquisition of many smaller companies into much larger ones
- Corporate social responsibility – Form of corporate self-regulation aimed at contributing to social or charitable goals
- Demerger – Form of corporate restructuring
- Disinvestment – Concerted economic boycott to pressure a change in policy
- Fossil fuel divestment – Divestment in companies that extract fossil fuels
- Financial economics – Academic discipline concerned with the exchange of money
- Tax resistance – Refusal to pay a tax in opposition to government policy or taxation itself
- Socially responsible investing – Any investment strategy combining both financial performance and social/ethical impact
- Stranded asset – Former physical asset, now a liability
