= Ryan Reid =

Ryan Reid may refer to:

- Ryan Reid (basketball) (1986–2025), American basketball player
- Ryan Reid (baseball) (born 1985), American baseball pitcher

== See also ==
- Ryan Reed (born 1993), American stock car race driver
- Ryan Reed (bishop) (born 1967), American Anglican bishop
- Ryan Spencer Reed (born 1979), American photographer
- Reid Ryan (born 1971), American baseball executive
