= Eco-investing =

Investment strategy

Eco-investing or green investing is a form of socially responsible investing where investments are made in companies that support or provide environmentally friendly products and practices. These companies encourage (and often profit from) new technologies that support the transition from carbon dependence to more sustainable alternatives. Green finance is "any structured financial activity that’s been created to ensure a better environmental outcome."

As industries' environmental impacts increased, environmental sustainability then took center stage in pop-culture and the financial world as well. In the 1990s, many investors turned to more environmentally friendly institutions. While some investors still rely on their funds to decrease their ecological footprints, many of them kept the same practices. Investment in companies that are damaging to the environment, and investment into the infrastructure that supports those companies detract from environmentally sustainable investment.

The Global Climate Prosperity Scoreboard – launched by Ethical Markets Media and The Climate Prosperity Alliance to monitor private investments in green companies – estimated that over $1.248 trillion has been invested in solar, wind, geothermal, ocean/hydro and other green sectors since 2007. This number represents investments from North America, China, India, and Brazil, as well at other developing countries.

== Eco/green investing versus socially-responsible investing ==
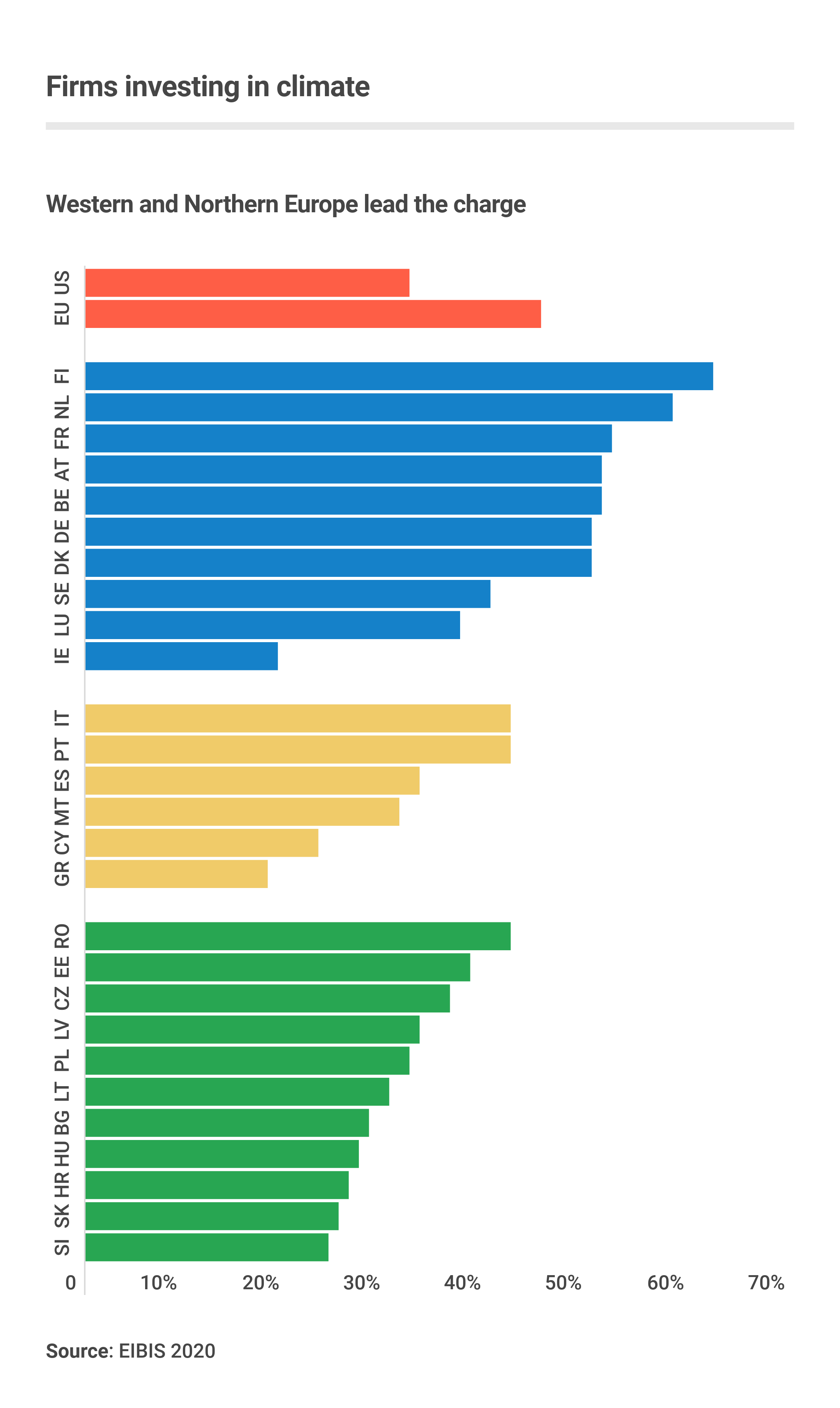
Firms investing in climate in Europe as found in the European Investment Bank's Investment Survey 2020

While many eco-investments may be considered socially responsible investments, and vice versa, the two are not mutually inclusive. Socially responsible investing is the practice of investing only in those companies which satisfy certain moral or ethical criteria. This may include companies with an interest in the environment, but also supports various other social and religious issues.

Eco-investing narrows in on the interests of sustainable environmental issues. Specifically, eco-investments focus on companies who work on renewable energy and clean technologies.

== Eco-investing sectors ==
There are several sectors that fall under the eco-investing umbrella. Renewable energy refers to both solar, wind, tidal current, wave and conventional hydro technology. This includes companies that build solar panels or wind turbines, or the raw materials and services that contribute to these technologies It also refers to energy storage companies that develop and use technologies to store large amounts of energy, particularly renewable energies. A good example of this is the fuel cells used in hybrid cars. Also under the renewable energy sector are biofuels. This group includes companies that use or supply biological resources (like algae, corn or waster wood) to create energy or fuel. Other companies that are included in the renewable energy group are geothermal power companies who use or convert heat to electric energy and hydroelectric companies who harness water energy to make electricity.

Investment into green sectors often involves the development of new technologies that are more environmentally friendly. This comes with high up-front costs that are more difficult to justify to investors.

The Buildings and Efficiency sector refers to companies that manufacture green building materials or energy-efficient services in the world of engineering and architecture. Green building materials include energy-efficient glass, insulation, and lighting among others. Recycling companies and energy conservation companies also fall under this sector.

The Eco Living sector refers to companies that offer sustainable goods and services for healthy living. This includes "green" pesticides, health care, and pharmaceuticals.

Green investment has significantly grown in the UK and there were 136 funds listed on the Worldwise Investor fund library. under the themes: agriculture, carbon, clean energy, forestry, environmental, Multi-thematic and water. In 2018 of these funds accounted for around £21.8bn in the UK.

== Environmental ratings ==
Companies have emerged to evaluate and rate companies' overall performance in their impacts to the environment. Sustainalytics and RepRisk are two examples of firms now collecting, compiling and publishing lists and scorecards of environmental and other risks.

== See also ==
- Climate finance – Type of investment in the context of climate action
- Climate-related asset stranding – Former physical asset, now a liability
- Ethical banking – Bank concerned with the social and environmental impacts of its investments and loans
- Greenwashing – Misleading environmental marketing claims
- Market-based environmental policy instruments – Economic policy instruments
- Sustainable products – Environmentally-beneficial products
- Terror-free investing
