= Dwight Hall Socially Responsible Investment Fund =

Dwight Hall Socially Responsible Investment Fund at Yale
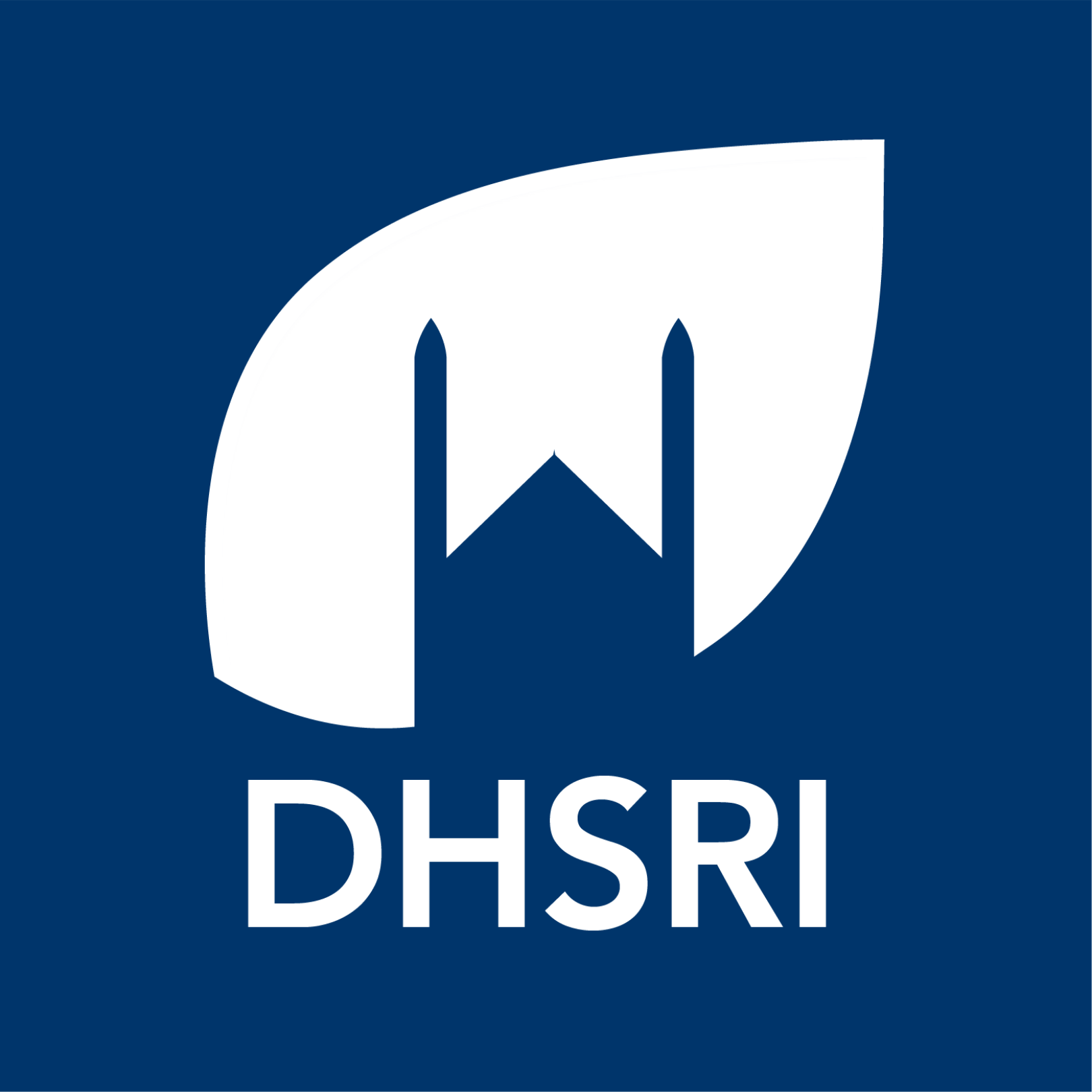

General Information
- Location: New Haven, Connecticut
- Executive Board: Leo Craig, Claire Xu, Sam Lu, Jenney Huang, Jayden Simon, Jesse Zhong, Emma Qiao, Arnav Nawani, Hyren Gan, Yunhan Liu, Spencer Smith, Otis Ikpase, Matthew Wu, Grace Liu, Yoobin Oh
- Focus: Socially responsible investing, Education, Student activism
- Method: Socially Responsible Investing
- Endowment: US$ 260 thousand
- Current Committee Size: 20 members
- Homepage: www.dwighthallsri.org

The Dwight Hall Socially Responsible Investment Fund at Yale ("DHSRI", "Dwight Hall Fund") is an undergraduate-run socially responsible investment fund in the United States. Initially seeded with $50,000 from the Dwight Hall organization endowment, the fund is expected by the Dwight Hall Board of Directors and Trustees to grow to a $500,000 fundraising target. Managed by a committee of twenty undergraduate Yale College students, the fund makes use of traditional methods of socially responsible investing (SRI) to have a positive environmental and social impact while aiming to outperform standard investment benchmarks and maximize financial return.

The Dwight Hall SRI Fund pays out 4.25% of its value to Dwight Hall, which is the umbrella public service and social justice organization on Yale's campus. With over $260,000 in assets under management (AUM), the fund targets an allocation of 35% domestic equity, 30% foreign equity, 25% alternatives, and 10% fixed income. In the past, the DHSRI shareholder engagement team has spoken with executives from ExxonMobil and Merck Pharmaceuticals and has attended Exxon's Annual General Meeting for the past three years. As of 2020, DHSRI's mission driven portfolio, which features corporations intended for student shareholder engagement activities, includes Exxon Mobil Corporation, Merck & Co, McDonald's Corporation and Amazon.com, Inc.

== History ==
Founded in 2007, the DHSRI fund was initially seeded with a $50,000 portion of the Dwight Hall at Yale Organization's endowment . As the umbrella volunteer organization on Yale's campus, Dwight Hall invests a large portion of its endowment with the Yale Investments Office, which is headed by the money-manager David Swensen. Originally created to align Dwight Hall endowment in a manner consistent with its mission, the DHSRI fund has become a model for student and community activism and has also provided additional transparency to Dwight Hall's investment practices. Along with the Responsible Endowment Project (REP) and the Yale Advisory Committee on Investor Responsibility (ACIR), the DHSRI fund has been relatively successful in terms of enforcing ethical and social responsibility standards on the Yale University endowment; in order to fit with its ethical considerations guidelines, the Yale endowment has ceased to further invest with the HEI Hotels & Resorts. In response to student protest, the Harvard Management Company has also agreed to look into HEI Hotels & Resorts over complaints about its business practices and labor policies. In 2020, DHSRI engaged in the first-ever Intentional Endowments Network SIILK Corporate Engagement Competition focused on ESG investment analysis and ideas for shareholder engagement strategies that aim to improve a company's financial and sustainability performance.

The launch of the DHSRI fund marked the first undergraduate-run socially responsible fund in the United States.

== SRI and measuring impact ==
The DHSRI fund employs several traditional SRI techniques when it comes to investing. One technique that the Fund employs is that it invests with other established SRI funds which use environmental Social and Corporate Governance (ESG) to positive screen and actively look for companies that conduct business in desirable fields such as solar energy companies. Another technique is negative screening which is used to exclude certain industries such as alcohol, tobacco, weapons and ammunition, and pornography when making investments. A third SRI technique that the DHSRI fund uses is shareholder advocacy.

Currently, the DHSRI fund has invested a total of $20,000 in CDs (certificate of deposit) with New Haven Start Community Bank and the Community Bank of Bridgeport in order to promote increased lending to local small business owners in the area. Measuring the direct and indirect impact of such investments is difficult, but is one of the current projects of the SRI fund.

== The Association for the Advancement of Sustainability in Higher Education ==
In 2011, the Association for the Advancement of Sustainability in Higher Education (AASHE) awarded the Dwight Hall Socially Responsible Investment Fund at Yale University a score of 0.25/0.25 on its Sustainability Tracking Assessment & Rating System (STARS). The STARS scoring system is applicable to any institution of higher education that offers business or economics coursework related to investment strategies. The basis on which credit is awarded is determined by whether or not the institution has a student-managed SRI fund through which students are able to develop skills in the field of socially responsible investing. There are currently 181 institutional participants in the STARS program and 173 institutional participants in the AASHE program.

== College endowments ==
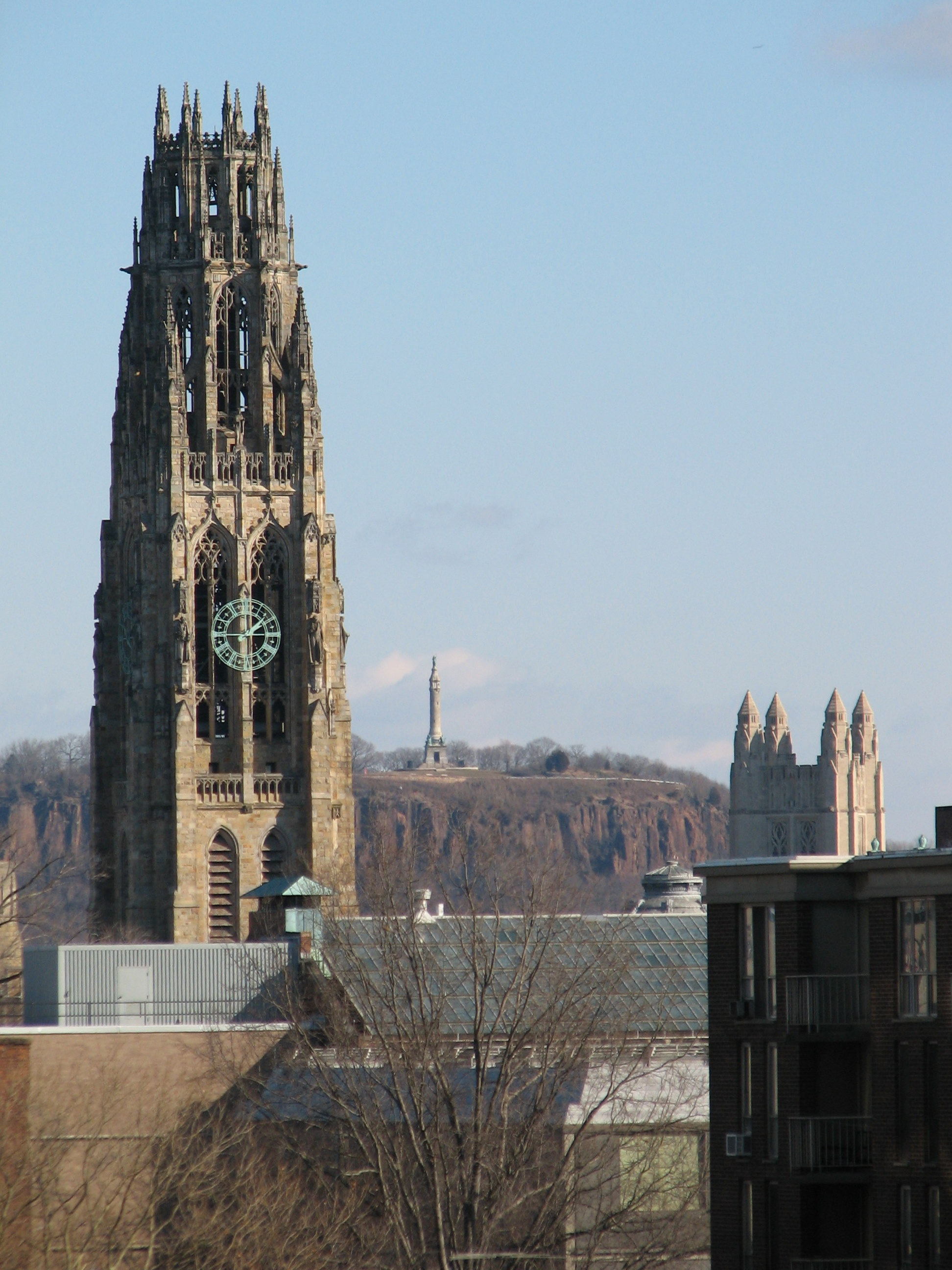
Yale University and New Haven

This active-investor role of endowments is particularly significant to college towns and their surrounding communities because the ever-increasing aggregate sum of college and university endowments worldwide has led to these higher-education institutions becoming significant players in the financial realm. In a bid to redefine the traditionally adversarial Town and gown relationship, student and faculty activism has established a new ethical standard on endowment investments and has also driven the creation of ethical advisory committees to monitor and oversee such institutional endowments. The twenty undergraduate committee members are currently working to help inspire the creation of similar funds at other colleges.

== The Yale endowment ==
As noted on the Yale Advisory Committee on Investor Responsibility (ACIR) website, "Yale was one of the first institutions to address formally the ethical responsibilities of institutional investors." As a result, Yale published The Ethical Investor: Universities and Corporate Responsibility in 1972 and has used to it establish procedures on how members of a community can impact the investment decision-making process of university endowments. A copy of the Ethical Investor can be found on the ACIR website. In order to fit with its ethical considerations guidelines, the Yale endowment has ceased to further invest with the HEI Hotels & Resorts and has also divested from oil and natural gas companies in Sudan.

== Shareholder engagement ==
The Dwight Hall SRI Fund was the first undergraduate-run student fund to ever co-file a shareholder resolution with a public company when it filed a resolution with ExxonMobil in the 2015-16 proxy season. The United Steelworkers Union (USW) lead filed the resolution and a number of others, including AP7, a Swedish national pension fund, also co-filed. The resolution targeted Exxon's lobbying practices and policies and asked for the company to improve its disclosure, especially regarding its membership in and payments to trade associations that conduct lobbying activities, like the American Legislative Exchange Council (ALEC), American Petroleum Institute (API), and National Association of Manufacturers (NAM)). Exxon is a member in a number of organizations that either cast doubt onto the scientific consensus on climate change or actively lobby against productive climate policy, despite Exxon's publicly stated acceptance of the scientific consensus and support for a revenue-neutral carbon tax.

The resolution garnered the support of 25.7% of Exxon shareholders, amounting to just under $100 billion of financial support. Proxy advisory firm Institutional Shareholder Services (ISS) recommended that shareholders vote in favor of the resolution. The resolution also received the support of the Interfaith Coalition on Investor Responsibility (ICCR) and other socially motivated investment organizations. Likely most significant of all, the Yale ACIR, and by extension, Yale University, publicly stated its support of the resolution, providing an opportunity for the University to test the efficacy of shareholder engagement through Dwight Hall SRI.

The Dwight Hall SRI Fund filed the resolution again in the 2016-17 proxy season. The group authored a chapter detailing its advocacy work in the seminal textbook Sustainable Investing: Revolutions in Theory and Practice.

In November 2016, DHSRI purchased 40 shares of Merck and Co, an ethical leader in the pharmaceutical industry, intending to engage productively and respectfully with the company surrounding new avenues for disclosure that provide financial and ethical benefits to the company and its shareholders.

During 2020, DHSRI added McDonald's Corporation and Amazon.com, Inc to its mission driven portfolio with the mission of engaging in the areas of workers rights, nutrition, racial equity, and environmental impact.
