= ICCR =

ICCR stands for:

- Indian Council for Cultural Relations
- Interfaith Center on Corporate Responsibility
