= Ryan Spencer Reed =

American social documentary photographer (born 1979)

- Born: 1979 (age 46–47); Ludington, Michigan, U.S.
- Education: Calvin College, B.A. (2002)
- Occupation: Photographer
- Website: www.ryanspencerreed.com

Ryan Spencer Reed (born 1979) is an American social documentary photographer. He has worked in Central and East Africa in the capacity of a photojournalist, covering the Sudanese Diaspora, since 2002. After returning from covering the War in Darfur in summer 2004, he and his work have moved around North America to universities in the form of traveling exhibitions and lectures. The Open Society Institute & Soros Foundation awarded him with the Documentary Photography Project's Distribution Grant in 2006.

While exhibiting and speaking internationally on the subject of Sudan, Reed has photographed extensively on the hubris of power amidst the twilight of the U.S. industrial revolution, which is touring in exhibition form. Since Spring of 2012, Reed took on a long-term project on the modern incarnation of the Band of Brothers: 506th Parachute Infantry Regiment of the 101st Airborne through training and a deployment to Afghanistan. This work was unveiled in its entirety at the Grand Rapids Art Museum in the Fall of 2014. The work aims to catalyze a dialogue on the dissonance between the myths and realities of war.

== Group exhibitions ==
- New York Historical Society, New York City
- Field Museum of Natural History, Chicago, IL
- Jewish Museum Berlin, GERMANY
- United States Holocaust Memorial Museum, Washington D.C.
- National Constitution Center, Philadelphia
- Cairo Opera House, Egypt
- Jardin Du Trocadero, Paris
- National Museum of Bosnia and Herzegovina, Sarajevo
- Holocaust Centre, Cape Town
- George Eastman House, Rochester, New York
- Ortaköy Peir Square, Istanbul
- Gare do Oriente’s Main Square, Lisbon
- Guthrie Theater, Minneapolis
- La Casa Encendida, Madrid
- Musée des beaux-arts de Montréal, CANADA
- Institute of Contemporary Art, Boston
- Centro Internazionale de Fotografia (FORMA), Milan, Italy
- International Center of Photography, New York City
- Royal Ontario Museum, Toronto, Canada
- Grand Rapids Art Museum, Grand Rapids, Michigan
- Museu de les Ciències Príncipe Felipe, Valencia, Spain
- City Museum of Ljubljana, Ljubljana
- Hammer Museum, Los Angeles
- Ban Jelačić Square, Zagreb, Croatia
- Sun Valley Center for the Arts, Sun Valley, ID
- Schouwburg Cultural Center, Rotterdam, Netherlands
- Stockholm International Fairs, Sweden
- University of the Witwatersrand, Senate House, Johannesburg, South Africa
- University of South Africa, Pretoria, South Africa
- Brown University List Art Center, Providence, Rhode Island
- Detroit Public Library, Detroit
- Scottsdale Center for the Performing Arts, Scottsdale, Arizona
- Spertus Institute, Chicago
- Galerie Mirchandani+Steinruecke, India
- Ana Tzarev Gallery, New York City
- The LUMIX Festival for Young Photojournalism, Hanover, Germany

== Solo exhibitions ==
- Harvard Law School, Massachusetts
- Michigan State University College of Law, Michigan
- Northwestern University, Illinois;
- Swarthmore College, Pennsylvania
- Kean University, New Jersey;
- Temple Sholom, Chicago
- University of Colorado at Boulder, Colorado
- Bucknell University, Pennsylvania
- City Waukegan/Urban Edge Gallery, Illinois
- Wilkes University, Pennsylvania
- Richard App Gallery, Michigan
- Naples Holocaust Museum, Florida
- SRI in the Rockies Conference, British Columbia, Canada
- Ohio Wesleyan University, Ohio
- Calvin College, Michigan
- Huntington University, Indiana
- Jackson Symphony Orchestra, Michigan
- Grace Presbyterian, Alberta, Canada
- Birmingham-Southern College, Alabama
- Ogden Arts, Utah
- Concordia University, Michigan
- Dordt College, Iowa
- Samford University, Tennessee
- Hope College, Michigan
- Ann Arbor District Library, Michigan
- Muskegon Community College, Michigan

== Visiting artist lectures ==
- Field Museum of Natural History, Chicago
- Harvard University, Boston
- Glenbow Museum, Alberta, Canada
- Yale University, New Haven, Connecticut
- University of Calgary, Alberta, Canada
- Detroit Public Library, Detroit
- Kean University, New Jersey
- University of Vermont, Burlington, Vermont
- Weber State University Convocation, Ogden, Utah
- King's College, Wilkes-Barre, Pennsylvania
- Furman University, South Carolina
- Grand Valley State University, Grand Rapids, Michigan
- University of Illinois, Springfield, Illinois

== Awards ==
- Pictures of the Year International (POYi) 2015 World Understanding Award Judges' Special Recognition "Despite Similarities to Reality"
- Photolucida 2015 Critical Mass Top 50 "Despite Similarities to Reality"
- Leica Oskar Barnack Award 2015 Finalist and Public Award Winner
- Freedom to Create Prize, "Sudan: The Cost of Silence
- Open Society Foundations & Soros Foundation Documentary Photography Project Distribution Grant, "Sudan: The Cost of Silence"

== Selected publications ==
- This is Not a Requiem for Detroit Virginia Quarterly Review, Spring 2011, pp. 124–147.
- Detroit Forsaken, Ryan Spencer Reed Photo Technique Magazine, March/April 2011.
- "Darfur/Darfur: Life/War." New York: DK Melcher Media, 2008. ISBN 1-59591-045-X. Reed is one of the eight photographers of this book.
- Google Earth Mapping Initiatives: Crisis in Darfur Layers. Reed is one of the seven photographers.
