= The SRI Conference =

Sustainable and responsible investing conference (SRI)
- Status: No longer active
- Genre: ESG investing
- Venue: Different hotels in North America
- Location: Colorado Springs, Colorado
- Country: United States
- Inaugurated: 1990
- Most recent: 2019
- Organizer: First Affirmative Financial Network, LLC
- Website: www.sriconference.com

The SRI Conference was an annual North American conference for the sustainable and responsible investing (SRI) industry that ran from 1990 until 2019. The conference attracted Environmental, social, and governance (ESG) investment professional, asset managers, social investment researches, and non-profits. The last conference held was SRI30 in November 2019 in Colorado Springs. The following years conference, which was scheduled to be held in 2020 in Orlando Florida, was cancelled due to the COVID-19 pandemic.

No further conferences were scheduled and the conference organisation and web site were taken down around October 2021.

== History ==
The conference was founded in 1990 by George R. Gay, and grew from 45 to over 1,200 participants. Attendees include investment professionals in the SRI industry: licensed investment professionals, SRI mutual fund companies, asset managers, community development financial institutions, social research and proxy voting organizations, faith-based institutional investors, and social change non-profits. The SRI Conference, formerly SRI in the Rockies, convened throughout the United States, and occasionally in Canada.

== Agenda ==
The SRI Conference agenda was divided into four tracks: ESG Integration/Portfolio Management, Impact Investing, Shareowner Engagement, and Practice Management for Financial Planners and Investment Advisors.

== Venues ==
The SRI Conference required prospective venues to complete the Best Practice Survey of the Green Hotel Initiative. In addition, selection criteria include a review of the venue’s environmental practices, the property’s carbon footprint, availability of locally grown and/or organic food products, access to public transportation, recycling practices, and cultural sensitivity to Native American or First Nations images, language, and cultural or religious sites.

The SRI Conference purchases carbon offsets to cover meeting and lodging room space and staff travel. NativeEnergy was the carbon offset provider from 2006, providing support to alternative energy projects on Native American lands and elsewhere.

== Conference organizer ==
The SRI Conference was produced by First Affirmative Financial Network, LLC. The company was based in Colorado Springs, Colorado, and was registered as an Independent Registered Investment Advisor.

== See also ==
- Community development financial institution
- Corporate social responsibility
- Ethical banking
- Interfaith Center on Corporate Responsibility
- Socially responsible investing
- Sustainability reporting
- Triple bottom line
