= Disinvestment from Israel =

Economic boycott campaign against Israel

Disinvestment from Israel is a campaign that aims to use disinvestment to pressure the government of Israel to put "an end to the Israeli occupation of Palestinian territories captured during the 1967 military campaign." The disinvestment campaign is related to other economic and political boycotts of Israel.

A notable campaign was initiated in 2002 and endorsed by South Africa's Desmond Tutu. Tutu said that the campaign against Israel's occupation of the Palestinian territories and its continued settlement expansion should be modeled on the successful historical disinvestment campaign against South Africa's apartheid system.

There have been renewed calls for disinvestment from Israel in 2024 as pro-Palestine protests in the United States have increased nationwide there, especially on college campuses.

== Initial call to action ==
Divestment campaigns targeting Israel first received media attention in 2002, thanks largely to a high-profile divestment petition at Harvard University and the Massachusetts Institute of Technology early that year. This was followed later that same year by calls from South African anti-apartheid activist Desmond Tutu for the international community to treat Israel as it treated apartheid South Africa:

The origin of the Israeli divestment campaigns can be traced back to the early 1990s just after similar programs targeting South Africa proved successful in (1) rallying political activists and (2) contributing to pressures that – along with other economic and political factors - led to an end to white minority rule in that country.

== Targets for disinvestment ==
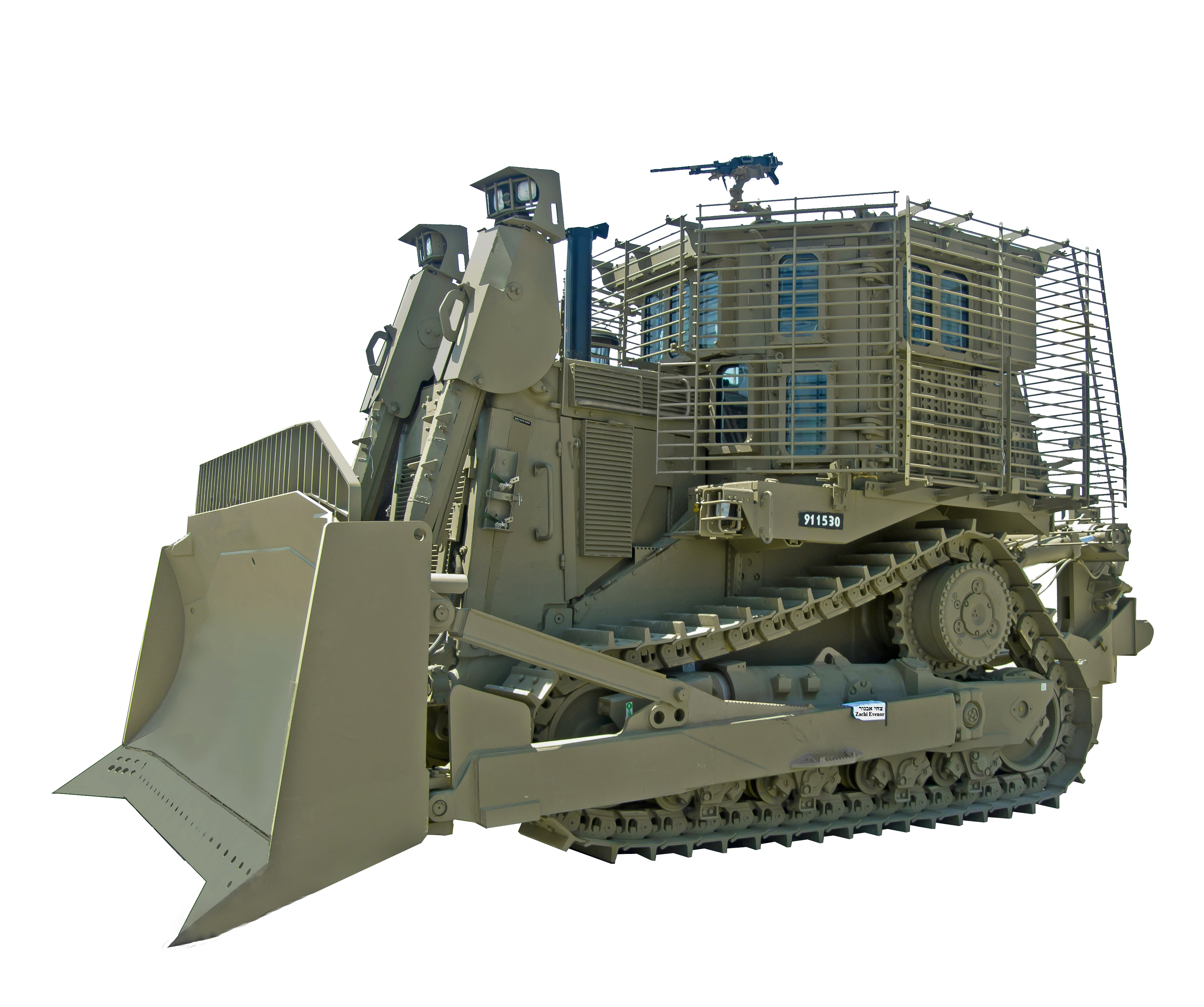
Caterpillar D9 armored bulldozer used by the Israel Defense Forces, often used demolishing Palestinian houses and properties. A U.N. expert has called for boycott of several companies that operate in occupied Palestinian Territories, among them Caterpillar

Disinvestment campaigns have been focused on high-profile organizations with large financial holdings such as endowed universities or churches and municipalities managing large portfolios of retirement fund investments. Such high-profile institutions, like Harvard University or the multimillion-member Presbyterian and Methodist Churches, provided divestment proponents a platform from which to spotlight their political activity. In addition, the wide financial holdings of these institutions generally provided divestment campaigns a list of stocks upon which to base their calls for divestment.

== Disinvestment efforts ==
Much of the disinvestment activity that has been widely publicized has come from the English-speaking world, but many Muslim groups have also called for divestment. Efforts have ranged from general boycotts to targeting specific Israeli companies.

=== United States ===
==== Churches ====
===== Presbyterian Church (USA) =====
In July 2004, the 2.4-million-member Presbyterian Church (USA), voted 431 to 62 in July to "initiate a process of phased selective divestment in multinational corporations operating in Israel." The Church manages a set of investment funds totaling approximately $7 billion USD.

According to the Church's highest elected official, Rev. Clifton Kirkpatrick, there is no plan for a "blanket divestment" from Israeli companies, but instead the Church will "target businesses that it believes bear particular responsibility for the suffering of Palestinians and will give them a chance to change their behavior before selling their shares." Church officials, according to The Washington Post, mentioned Caterpillar Inc. as a possible target of the selective divestment campaign because the company "manufactures bulldozers used by Israel to demolish Palestinian homes that are built without permits or belong to families of suicide bombers."

There was significant opposition in the American Jewish community to the Church's decision. The Washington Post reported in September 2004 that "Jewish-Presbyterian relations have been in turmoil" and that "the heads of several major U.S. Jewish organizations condemned the Presbyterian Church's decision to begin selective divestiture in companies operating in Israel." The executive vice president of the Central Conference of American Rabbis, Rabbi Paul Menitoff, said the resolution was "lopsided" and that it unfairly blamed only one side in the Palestinian-Israeli conflict.

In response to the criticism, Kirkpatrick said that the Church would also "pull its money out of any companies that are complicit in supporting terrorism."

On 29 June 2006, the Presbyterian Church (USA) General Assembly by a vote of 483-28 adopted a balanced resolution that replaced language adopted in 2004 mandating a process of divestment focused on Israel and endorsed instead a corporate engagement process. Instead of using the word "divestment", the resolution calls for the Church to invest only in companies who are involved in "peaceful pursuits" in Israel and Palestinian territories.

In July 2012, the Presbyterian Church (USA) General Assembly decided to reject divestment and instead focus on investment. By a narrow vote of 333–331, the members voted to discard a resolution proposing divestment from Israel. This was followed by a vote of 369–290, with eight abstentions, for the church to pursue positive investment in the territories.

In June 2014, the General Assembly, meeting in Detroit, voted 310–303 to divest from Caterpillar, Hewlett-Packard and Motorola Solutions. Supporters of the resolution said those companies were involved with "demolition and surveillance activities against Palestinians in the West Bank".

===== World Council of Churches =====
In February 2005, the Geneva-based World Council of Churches followed suit. The resolution passed by WCC's 150-member Central Committee commended the selective divestment resolution passed by the Presbyterian Church (USA) saying that the previous resolution "in both method and manner, uses criteria rooted in faith and calls members to do the things that make for peace." The WCC planned to focus "on companies that assist the Israeli government in demolishing Palestinian homes, constructing settlements, and erecting a controversial 'dividing wall' within the Palestinian territories."

"The unexpected resolution", according to a BeliefNet report, "caught many American Jewish groups off guard and confirmed fears among some that the Presbyterians opened a Pandora's box last summer that now has the tacit approval of global Protestant and Orthodox leaders. Rabbi Gary Bretton-Granatoor, interfaith director for the Anti-Defamation League, dismissed the WCC as 'irrelevant' but was nonetheless concerned that the divestment campaign has taken on a life of its own."

===== United Church of Christ =====
The United Church of Christ also followed suit, endorsing a range of economic leverages that included divestment, but church leaders did not commit their pension or foundation assets to a divestment plan.

===== United Methodist Church =====
In June 2005, the New England Conference of the United Methodist Church had voted to urge the divesting of funds from companies that support the Israeli occupation of Palestinian Territories. The resolution stated:

- "Whereas the United Methodist Church should not profit from the illegal Israeli occupation of Palestinian land or the destruction of Palestinian homes, orchards, and lives,"
- "Whereas we are committed to ensuring that our denomination's money is used in a manner consistent with our beliefs, with international law, and with Christ's teaching."

At the 2012 Tampa Conference, the United Methodist Church twice rejected resolutions on May 2, that called for divestment from companies that were accused of contributing to the "Israeli occupation of Palestinian territories", including "Caterpillar, Motorola Solutions and Hewlett-Packard." Approximately 2/3 of the 1,000 delegates in attendance rejected the divestment resolutions. The church also rejected similar resolutions in 2008. According to Reverend Bob Long, "Of course we care about the Palestinians, and what they've been through. But we also care about the Israelis and what they've been through."

In June 2014, the Methodist pension board voted to divest.

In May 2024, the United Methodist Church voted to divest from Israel bonds.

===== Episcopal Church =====
In July 2012, the Episcopal Church adopted a resolution at its General Convention Assembly that supported "a negotiated two-state solution" and "positive investment" rather than divestment from Israel.

===== Others =====
Other mainline churches have debated the subject of divestment. The Evangelical Lutheran Church in America rejected a pro-divestment resolution during the summer of 2005. The Episcopal Church USA ruled out the possibility of an Israel divestment later that year, and the United Methodist Church has also avoided divestment.

==== Universities ====
- University of California, Berkeley (ASUC) 11-9-0
- University of California, Irvine (ASUCI) 16-0-0
- University of California, Riverside (ASUCR) 8-7-0
- Loyola University Chicago (USGA) 12-10-9 (Vetoed)
- University of California, San Diego (ASUCSD) 20-12-1
- University of California, Santa Cruz (SUA) 22-14
- University of California, Los Angeles (USAC) 8-2-2
- University of California, Davis (ASUCD) 8-2-2 (Vacated by Student Govt. Court)
- Stanford University (SU) 10-4-1

At universities the focus has largely been to pass resolutions supporting divestment in student government. Few campaigns have gone further than these resolutions in pressuring universities to agree to divest. Some student organizations support the broader Boycott, Divestment and Sanctions campaign on campus, often in cooperation with other progressive campus groups.

On 17 March 2010, a UC Berkeley Student Senate resolution asked that the university divest itself of companies that conduct business with Israel, especially targeting General Electric and United Technologies which supplies arms and technology to Israel, but it was vetoed on 24 March by the Student Body President who called it "a symbolic attack on a specific community". In 2013, another UC Berkeley Student Senate resolution was passed as SB160, which proposed the university divest itself of companies complicit in Israel's abuse of human rights in Gaza.

On February 8, 2015, the University of California Student Association passed a resolution calling on the UC Board of Regents to divest from companies violating Palestinian human rights in the West Bank and Gaza. The historic vote passed in an overwhelming majority of 9–1 with 6 abstentions.

In May 2015, the Princeton graduate student community voted by a margin of 56%-39% (4.5% abstaining) in favor of a non-binding resolution to "divest from multinational corporations that maintain the infrastructure of the Israeli occupation of the West Bank, facilitate Israel's and Egypt's collective punishment of Palestinian civilians in the West Bank and Gaza Strip, or facilitate state repression against Palestinians by Israeli, Egyptian, and Palestinian Authority security forces, until these corporations cease such activities."

===== Columbia University =====
In October 2002, during the Second Intifada, the Columbia/Barnard Faculty Committee on Divestment released a petition for Columbia to divest from companies that it said manufacture arms for or sell arms to Israel, specifically Boeing, General Electric, Caterpillar, and Lockheed Martin, for a total withdrawal of $8,118,225 in investments. Rabbi Charles Sheer, director of the Columbia-Barnard chapter of Hillel, led a campaign in 2003 against the divestment proposal that gathered 33,000 signatures in support. The petition did not pass.

On November 16, 2025, Columbia's Advisory Committee on Socially Responsible Investing (ACSRI) announced its rejection of three proposals from the 2024–2025 academic year to divest from Israel or companies that "engage in, profit from, or support Gross Violations of Human Rights and International Law, including war crimes". ACSRI criteria for consideration require what it calls "broad consensus within the University community". On February 29, 2024, ACSRI had rejected CUAD's December 2023 proposal to divest from Israel, which ACSRI said failed to reach broad consensus. The Columbia College student body passed a referendum in favor of divestment from Israel with 76.55% in support and a 40.26% voter participation rate. ACSRI said that Columbia College was but 1 of 17 schools and that the university community was not only current students but "all living alumni, faculty, and students".

=== United Kingdom ===
In 2006, the Church of England synod voted to end investments in companies supporting Israel's occupation of the Palestinian territories. This was criticised by George Carey, the former Archbishop of Canterbury as "inappropriate, offensive and highly damaging".

=== Ireland ===
At its biennial delegate conference held in May 2008, IMPACT (the Irish Municipal, Public and Civil Trade Union), Ireland's largest public sector and services trade union, passed two resolutions criticising Israeli suppression of the Palestinians and endorsing a boycott of Israeli goods and services. The motions also supported divestment from those corporations engaged in or profiting from the occupation of the West Bank and Gaza.

=== Canada ===
==== 2006 ====
The Toronto assembly of the United Church of Canada supports CUPE's boycott. In 2003, the Toronto assembly voted to boycott goods produced by Jewish settlements in the occupied territories. The national umbrella UCC absolved itself of a boycott by instead choosing to support pro-peace investment.

On 27 May 2006, the Ontario section of the Canadian Union of Public Employees (which represents more than 200,000 workers) approved a resolution to "support the international campaign of boycott, divestment and sanctions against Israel until that state recognizes the Palestinian right to self-determination" and to protest the Israeli West Bank barrier.

Abraham Foxman of the Anti-Defamation League labelled CUPE's action as "deplorable and offensive." The Ontario regional director of the Canadian Jewish Congress, Steven Schulman, characterized the vote as "outrageous." "For a respected labour union to engage in such a vote, which is completely one-sided and based on mistruths, is shocking," he said.

The Congress of South African Trade Unions published a letter expressing their support for the CUPE boycott of Israel.

==== 2009 ====
In January 2009, CUPE's Ontario University Workers Coordinating Committee announced plans to introduce Resolution 50 that would ban Israeli academics from speaking, teaching or researching at Ontario universities. Sid Ryan, president of CUPE Ontario, stated that "Israeli academics should not be on our campuses unless they explicitly condemn the university bombing and the assault on Gaza in general." Ryan stated that the resolution was a reasonable response to Israel's attack on the Islamic University, which he likened to the torching of books by Nazis during the Second World War.

Janice Folk-Dawson, chairwoman of the university workers committee, stated that resolution will protect the quality of education by preventing Israeli academics from professing biased views. She also stated that "International pressure on Israel must increase to stop the massacre that is going on daily. We are proud to add CUPE voices to others from around the world saying enough is enough" and that support for the resolution "is coming from the rank-and-file members, not just the leadership." Despite the expected backlash, Folk-Dawson stated that "We believe we are doing the right thing."

The resolution was immediately criticized by the Leo Rudner of the Canadian Jewish Congress, who stated "I think it's ironic individuals who speak about freedom of speech jump to the opportunity to take that freedom away from other individuals." Emanuel Adler, chairman of Israeli Studies at the University of Toronto, also criticized the resolution, stating that "the conflict and the violence should not be brought inside the university." Jonathan Kay, a columnist for the National Post, sharply criticized the resolution, stating that "Mr. Ryan and his fellow CUPE leaders care about demonizing only one country: the Jewish state."

Michael Neumann, a philosophy professor at Trent University in Peterborough, Ontario expressed support for the boycott. Neumann stated that "If people believe these are extreme circumstances and it will do some good, then I think it's reasonable and perhaps justified." He argued that a boycott is not antisemitic, stating that "It targets Israeli, not Jewish, professors." He further stated that "People may always have bad motives underlying good motives. And it's not absolutely impossible that some of these people have anti-Semitic feelings deep down, but do I think that plays a large part? No, I certainly do not."

Costanza Musu, an associate professor at the University of Ottawa, called the boycott "wrong and maladroit in every possible way" and stated that "It is a very sad moment when someone in academia starts considering the boycott of colleagues as a valid an honourable instrument of political struggle."

The resolution will be put to vote at the committee's annual conference in February. If it passes, it will be on the agenda at CUPE Ontario's conference in May. However, some observers have questioned what practical effect the resolution could have since CUPE's 200,000 workers province-wide include some campus staff but almost no full-time faculty.

On 14 January 2009, the University of Ottawa Centre for International Policy Studies, directed by Professor Roland Paris, published the following 'Statement on Freedom of Speech':

Freedom of speech is a core value of Canadian society, especially within its universities where the expression and debate of different positions is crucial to learning. As an academic centre that promotes research and dialogue on international policy, CIPS opposes the Canadian Union of Public Employees' contemplated ban on Israeli academics from speaking, teaching or research work at Ontario universities. CIPS will not participate in such a boycott or any other attempt to silence academics, including those expressing controversial or unpopular opinions. CIPS will continue to invite academics of any nationality to participate in scholarly activities and public speaking events in Ottawa.

=== Palestinian territories ===
On 9 July 2005, 171 Palestinian non-governmental organizations put out a call for an international economic campaign against Israel which has come to be referred to as Boycott, Divestment and Sanctions (BDS) after the resolution's call "… for Boycott, Divestment and Sanctions against Israel Until it Complies with International Law and Universal Principles of Human Rights." The three stated goals of the campaign are:

1. An end to Israel's "occupation and colonization of all Arab lands and dismantling the Wall;"
2. Israeli recognition of the "fundamental rights of the Arab-Palestinian citizens of Israel to full equality;" and,
3. Israeli respect, protection, and promotion of "the rights of Palestinian refugees to return to their homes and properties as stipulated in UN resolution 194."

Attempts to create a similar movement focusing on divestment from Israel, such as the Palestine Solidarity Committee's "Don't Pay for Occupation" campaign, failed to raise similar support, largely because (1) divestment was only one part of these program agendas which also focused on US foreign aid to Israel (as one activist put it "Although the campaign achieved many political aims, it failed to present a strategy of how one should not pay for occupation."); and (2) the notion that Israel was the natural successor to Apartheid South Africa as the next target for divestment was rejected not just by most American Jews and Jewish organizations, but also by human rights groups who had played a major role in the fight against Apartheid.

=== Norway ===
In May 2025, the Norwegian Confederation of Trade Unions voted unanimously to adopt a resolution calling to boycott Israel and calling the Norwegian government to divest funds from companies that support Israel. In August 2025, Norway's $2 trillion sovereign wealth fund, the world's largest investment fund, has pulled out of Caterpillar Inc. over what it says is its involvement in Israeli human rights abuses in Gaza and the occupied West Bank.

=== 2026 Sanctions on Israeli settlements in West Bank ===
In September 2026, Britain, Canada, and France said they would impose sanctions on Israeli settlements in the West Bank, which are considered illegal under international law. The sanctions aim to ban settlement goods, act against companies and individuals providing services to settlements and ban the advertisement of settlements in the UK. When announcing the sanctions, Foreign Secretary Ed Miliband said that the Israeli government has too often 'turned a blind eye' to the 'ethnic cleansing of Palestinians in areas of the West Bank, perpetrated by settler terrorists'. The Israeli government responded by closing the British consulate in Jerusalem and banning 11 UK MPs, including Jeremy Corbyn, Diane Abbott and all five sitting Green Party MPs, from entering Israel.

== Opinions ==
=== Supporters ===
Noam Chomsky argues that for maximum impact, disinvestment campaigns should target the corporations participating in the perceived human rights abuses, with Caterpillar Inc. given as an example due to their role in the demolition of Palestinian homes.

=== Opponents ===
Critics of the proposals argue that making unilateral demands on Israel will not promote negotiation and a just peace. Furthermore, disinvestment, it is claimed, would hurt Palestinians more than any other, as all of the Israeli factories located beyond the Green Line employ Palestinian workers, providing 70,000 jobs for Palestinians.

The Economist contends that

the boycotts [which include disinvestment, academic boycotts and product boycotts] look flimsy. Most of the motions passed have been non-binding recommendations, or instructions to investigate the practicalities of BDS. Activists' votes at conferences may be slapped down by the membership, as with the NUJ's boycott, which was reversed after furious complaints from members. After pressure from Jewish groups, American Presbyterians, who voted in 2004 to look into divesting from up to five American firms, backed off last year without having removed a dollar. The two British teaching unions merged and voted anew to consider suspending links with Israeli institutions only to provoke a huge counter-attack by American college presidents.

The Economist continues:

Even fans of BDS do not fully agree on the best way forward. While some call for broad boycotts, others think "smart sanctions", such as banning goods produced from settlements in the occupied territories, or from specific firms, will have more effect and sidestep claims of anti-Semitism. Israel's economy, they say, is more vulnerable to pressure than South Africa's—smaller, more globally connected and with fewer natural resources. "I don't think the boycotts will be as widespread as with South Africa," says Mr Hever, "but a small and specific economic impact can change many people's minds." Perhaps. But blaming Israel alone for the impasse in the occupied territories will continue to strike many outsiders as unfair.

In addition, Nathan J. Brown, writing on February 4, 2015 in the Carnegie Endowment for International Peace website, suggests that the U.S. Presbyterian Church and its divestment plan have now become entangled with the U.S. Internal Revenue Revenue Code. He writes that Shurat HaDin "a deep-pocketed legal advocacy organization anxious to take action against those it deems hostile to Israeli interests, accused the church of violating the tax code by having contact with Hezbollah, which Washington has designated as a terrorist organization."

== Historic antecedents ==
The Arab League boycott of Israel, which started in 1921 and was formalized in 1945, has included a call for Arab nations to divest from Israel.

== See also ==
- Boycott, Divestment and Sanctions
- Economic and political boycotts of Israel
- Arms embargoes on Israel since 2023
- Disinvestment from South Africa
- Socially responsible investing
- Terror-free investing
