= Disinvestment =

Concerted economic boycott to pressure a change in policy

Disinvestment refers to the use of a concerted economic boycott to pressure a government, industry, or company towards a change in policy, or in the case of governments, even regime change. The term was first used in the mid-1980s, most commonly in the United States, to refer to the use of a concerted economic boycott designed to pressure the government of South Africa into dismantling its apartheid system. The term has also been applied to actions targeting Iran, Sudan, Northern Ireland, Myanmar, Israel, China and Russia.

== Examples ==
=== Industries ===
- Global Climate Coalition – Ford, General Motors, Texaco, Southern Company, Exxon, and other corporate members of the Global Climate Coalition – an industry group opposing the Kyoto Protocol – were the target of a national disinvestment campaign run by Ozone Action in 2000. According to The New York Times, when Ford Motor Company left the coalition, it was "the latest sign of divisions within heavy industry over how to respond to global warming". After that, between December, 1999 and early March, 2000, the GCC was deserted by Daimler-Chrysler, Texaco, the Southern Company and General Motors. The organization closed in 2002, or in their own words, 'deactivated'. People associated with the campaign were John Passacantando, who served as the executive director of Ozone Action, and Phil Radford, the then field director of the organization. Both men later served as the executive director of Greenpeace
- Tobacco industry
- Arms trade
- Fossil fuels industry
- Factory farming

=== Environment ===
There is a movement to disinvest from coal, oil and gas companies. It is a social movement which urges everyone from individual investors to large endowed institutions to remove their investments (to divest) from publicly listed oil, gas and coal companies, with the intention of combating climate change by reducing the amount of greenhouse gases released into the atmosphere, and holding the oil, gas and coal companies responsible for their role in climate change.

Founder of the movement Bill McKibben, a researcher and academic from University of Victoria, and creator of the webpage 350.org stated: “If it is wrong to wreck the climate, then it is wrong to profit from the wreckage. We believe […] organizations that serve the public good should divest from fossil fuels”

=== Companies ===
- Talisman Energy - because of its status as the main Western oil company in Sudan in the early 2000s.

=== Nations ===
==== Iran ====
Eighteen American states have passed laws requiring the divestment of state pension funds from firms doing business with Iran.

==== South Africa ====
The most frequently-encountered method of "dis-investing" was to persuade state, county and municipal governments to sell their stock in companies which had a presence in South Africa, such shares having been previously placed in the portfolio of the state's, county's or city's pension fund. Several states and localities did pass legislation ordering the sale of such securities, most notably the city of San Francisco. An array of celebrities, including singer Paul Simon, actively supported the cause.

Many conservatives opposed the disinvestment campaign, accusing its advocates of hypocrisy for not also proposing that the same sanctions be leveled on either the Soviet Union or the People's Republic of China. Ronald Reagan, who was the President of the United States during the time the disinvestment movement was at its peak, also opposed it, instead favoring a policy of "constructive engagement" with the Pretoria regime. Some offered as an alternative to disinvestment the so-called "Sullivan Principles", named after Reverend Leon Sullivan, an African-American clergyman who served on the Board of Directors of General Motors. These principles called for corporations doing business in South Africa to adhere to strict standards of non-discrimination in hiring and promotions, so as to set a positive example.

==== Northern Ireland ====
There was also a less well-publicized movement to apply the strategy of disinvestment to Northern Ireland, as some prominent Irish-American politicians sought to have state and local governments sell their stock in companies doing business in that part of the United Kingdom. This movement featured its own counterpart to the Sullivan Principles; known as the "MacBride Principles" (named for Nobel Peace Prize winner Seán MacBride), which called for American and other foreign companies to take the initiative in nondiscrimination against Roman Catholics by adopting policies resembling affirmative action. The effort to disinvest in Northern Ireland met with little success, but the United States Congress did pass (and then-President Bill Clinton signed) a law requiring American companies with interests there to implement most of the MacBride Principles in 1998.

==== Cuba ====
Though in place long before the term "disinvestment" was coined, the United States embargo against Cuba meets many of the criteria for designation as such — and a provision more closely paralleling the disinvestment strategy aimed at South Africa was added in 1996, when the United States Congress passed the Helms-Burton Act, which penalized owners of foreign businesses which invested in former American firms that had been nationalized by Fidel Castro's government after the Cuban revolution of 1959. The passage of this law was widely seen as a reprisal for an incident in which Cuban military aircraft shot down two private planes flown by Cuban exiles living in Florida, who were searching for Cubans attempting to escape to Miami.

==== Sudan ====
During the late 1990s and early 2000s several Christian groups in North America campaigned for disinvestment from Sudan because of the Muslim-dominated government's long conflict with the breakaway, mostly Christian region of Southern Sudan. One particular target of this campaign was the Canadian oil company, Talisman Energy which eventually left the country, and was supplanted by Chinese investors.

There is currently a growing movement to divest from those that do business with the Sudanese government responsible for genocide in Darfur. Prompted by the State of Illinois – the first government in the US to divest – scores of public and private-sector entities are now following suit. In New York City, Councilman Eric Gioia introduced a resolution to divest City pension funds from companies doing business with Sudan.

The divestment of assets implicated in funding the government of Sudan, in acknowledgment of acts of terrorism and genocide perpetrated in the Darfur conflict. In the United States, this divestment has taken place at the state level (including Illinois, which led the way, followed by New Jersey, Oregon, and Maine). It has also taken place at many North American university endowments, including Cornell University, Harvard University, Case Western Reserve University, Queen's University, Stanford University, Dartmouth College, Amherst College, Yale University, Brown University, the University of California, the University of Pennsylvania, Brandeis University, the University of Colorado, American University, University of Delaware, Emory University, and the University of Vermont.

The Sudan Divestment Task Force has organized a nationwide group which advocates a targeted divestment policy, to minimize any negative effects on Sudanese civilians while still placing financial pressure on the government. The so-called 'targeted divestment approach' generally permits investment in Sudan, and is thus radically different from the comprehensive divestment that ended apartheid in South Africa.

Under this approach, sponsored by State Senator Jacqueline Collins, public pensions are prohibited from investing in any corporation or private equity firm that conducts business in Sudan, unless authorized to do so by the U.S. Government.

==== Israel ====
Disinvestment from Israel is a campaign that aims to use disinvestment to pressure the government of Israel to put "an end to the Israeli occupation of Palestinian territories captured during the 1967 military campaign." The disinvestment campaign is related to other economic and political boycotts of Israel.

A notable campaign was initiated in 2002 and endorsed by South Africa's Desmond Tutu. Tutu said that the campaign against Israel's occupation of the Palestinian territories and its continued settlement expansion should be modeled on the successful historical disinvestment campaign against South Africa's apartheid system.

There have been renewed calls for disinvestment from Israel in 2024 as pro-Palestine protests in the United States have increased nationwide there, especially on college campuses.

==== Russia ====
Several companies, such as oil giants BP and Shell, have disinvested from Russia following the 2022 Russian invasion of Ukraine. TikTok, also as a result of the invasion, also no longer allows new posts to be published in Russian territory, and YouTube does not allow Russian-backed channels to be monetised on the platform.

==== China ====
In January 2020, students at University of California, Los Angeles passed a resolution calling for divestment from China. In August 2020, Under Secretary of State Keith Krach called upon university administrators in the United States to divest their endowments from companies in China. In the letter, Krach cited an open letter released nationally in May 2020 by College Democrats and College Republicans that was written by the student-organized Athenai Institute, and numerous other organizations and individuals which called for the disclosure of all ties "between centers of higher learning and all Chinese state agencies and proxies".

In October 2021, students at The Catholic University of America unanimously passed a resolution, with the Athenai Institute calling upon their university administration to divest its endowment from companies complicit in the genocide of Uyghurs conducted by the Chinese government. This resulted in Catholic University committing to audit and divest its endowment, becoming the first university in the world to do so. According to Washington Post columnist Josh Rogin, this action marked the beginning of the "Uyghur Genocide University Divestment Movement". Following this, the Advisory Committee on Investor Responsibility at Yale University committed to examine potential investments in Chinese companies tied to human rights abuses. In January 2022, students at Georgetown University circulated an open letter calling for divestment from China. The letter was supported by a coalition of Georgetown's College Democrats, College Republicans, Muslim Student Association, Hong Kong Student Association, as well as individuals. Following this, the Georgetown University Student Association introduced and unanimously passed a resolution calling upon the university to divest its endowment. Similar action was taken by a coalition of students at the George Washington University in February 2022.

==== Others ====
Myanmar (formerly Burma) has also been the target of disinvestment campaigns (most notably the Massachusetts Burma Law initiated by the state of Massachusetts). Divestment campaigns have also been directed against Saudi Arabia due to allegations of "gender apartheid". The University of California, Riverside's Hillel chapter has a Saudi Divestment petition circulating as of 2007.

In 2007, several major international and Canadian oil companies threatened to withdraw investment from the province of Alberta because of a proposed increase in royalty rates.

== Criticism ==
Some hold that disinvestment campaigns are based on a fundamental misunderstanding of how stock markets work. John Silber, former president of Boston University, observed that while boycotting a company's products would actually affect their business, "once a stock issue has been made, the corporation doesn't care whether you sell it, burn it, or anything else, because they've already got all the money they're ever going to get from that stock. So they don't care."

Regarding the more specific case of South Africa, John Silber recalled:

...when the students were protesting the South African situation, I met with them, and they said BU must disinvest in General Motors and IBM. And I said, "Why should we do that? Is it immoral to own that stock?" Absolutely immoral to own it. And I said, "So then, we're supposed to sell it to somebody? We can't disinvest unless we sell it to somebody. And if we burn the stock, that just helps General Motors, because it reduces the amount of stock outstanding, so that can't be right. If we sell it to somebody, we have just gotten rid of our guilt in order to impose guilt on somebody else."

One criticism of disinvestment focuses on the belief that institutional selling of a certain stock lowers its market value. Therefore, the company's net worth becomes devalued and the owners of the company may lose substantial paper assets. In addition, institutional disinvestment may encourage other investors to sell their stocks for fear of lower prices, which in turn lowers prices even further. Finally, lower stock prices limits a corporation's ability to sell a portion of their stocks in order to raise funds to expand the business.This assumption about the intent behind many disinvestment movements is often incorrect. Disinvestment executions are often forms of denouncement and delegitimization of an industry, such as in the fossil-fuel disinvestment movement. Negative public perception can lead to reform and changes in policy, both privately for the company and in the public sphere.

== See also ==
- Economic and political boycotts of Israel – Aspect of the Israeli–Palestinian conflict
- Ethical consumerism – Type of consumer activism
- Fossil fuel divestment – Divestment in companies that extract fossil fuels
- Municipal disinvestment – Neglect of an area in urban planning
- Socially responsible investing – Any investment strategy combining both financial performance and social/ethical impact
- Privatization
