= Global Sustainable Investment Alliance =

Organization

Logo

The Global Sustainable Investment Alliance is an organization promoting sustainable investments through a series regional affiliates. GSIA members include the US SIF, European Sustainable Investment Forum (Eurosif), Responsible Investment Association Australasia (RIAA), the UK Sustainable Investment and Finance Association (UKSIF), the Responsible Investment Association of Canada (RIA), and the Dutch Association of Investors for Sustainable Development (VBDO).

GSIA publishes a biannual global Sustainable Investment Review with regional data around the world. According to the 2016 report, the global sustainable investment market reached $22.89 trillion at the beginning of 2016, a 25 percent increase from 2014.
