= Ruth Lautt =

Sister Ruth Lautt is an American Roman Catholic nun and activist. She is the founder of Christians for Fair Witness on the Middle East, an organization that describes itself as an advocacy group that works among mainline Protestants and Roman Catholics in North America for fairness in the churches’ witness on issues related to the conflict between Israel and its Arab neighbors.

== Career ==
Lautt holds a J.D. from New York University School of Law. Before entering the religious life as a Dominican nun, Sister Ruth was a litigator with Manhattan law firm of Skadden, Arps, Slate, Meagher & Flom.

Lautt is a member of the Sisters of St Dominic of Amityville, New York; she founded their Street Outreach Team.

== Issue positions ==
Lautt advocates a two-state solution to the Israeli-Arab conflict.

She has spoken out against anti-Semitism.

Lautt has questioned the criticisms leveled at Israel by some churches, asking, "how people feel they have the right in the name of peace and justice, to tell other people not to try to preserve their own lives... You’re not obligated to lay down and die.”
