= Sullivan principles =

Corporate codes of conduct

The Sullivan principles are the names of two corporate codes of conduct, developed by the African-American preacher Rev. Leon Sullivan, promoting corporate social responsibility.

The original Sullivan principles were developed in 1977 to apply economic pressure on South Africa in protest of its system of apartheid. The principles eventually gained wide adoption among United States–based corporations.

The new global Sullivan principles were jointly unveiled in 1999 by Rev. Sullivan and United Nations Secretary General Kofi Annan. The new and expanded corporate code of conduct, as opposed to the originals' specific focus on South African apartheid, were designed to increase the active participation of corporations in the advancement of human rights and social justice at the international level.

== The Sullivan principles ==
In 1977, Rev. Leon Sullivan, an African-American minister, was a member of the board of General Motors. At the time, General Motors was one of the largest corporations in the United States. General Motors also happened to be the largest employer of black people in South Africa, a country which was pursuing a harsh program of state-sanctioned racial segregation and discrimination targeted primarily at the country's black population.

Sullivan, looking back on his anti-Apartheid efforts, recalled:

Starting with the work place, I tightened the screws step by step and raised the bar step by step. Eventually I got to the point where I said that companies must practice corporate civil disobedience against the laws and I threatened South Africa and said in two years Mandela must be freed, apartheid must end, and blacks must vote or else I'll bring every American company I can out of South Africa.

=== The original principles ===
The Sullivan principles, introduced in 1977 with one addition in 1984, consisted of seven requirements a corporation was to demand for its employees as a condition for doing business. In general, the principles demanded the equal treatment of employees regardless of their race both within and outside of the workplace, demands which directly conflicted with the official South African policies of racial segregation and unequal rights.

The principles read:

The Sullivan principles
1. Non-segregation of the races in all eating, comfort, and work facilities.
2. Equal and fair employment practices for all employees.
3. Equal pay for all employees doing equal or comparable work for the same period of time.
4. Initiation of and development of training programs that will prepare, in substantial numbers, blacks and other nonwhites for supervisory, administrative, clerical, and technical jobs.
5. Increasing the number of blacks and other nonwhites in management and supervisory positions.
6. Improving the quality of life for blacks and other nonwhites outside the work environment in such areas as housing, transportation, school, recreation, and health facilities.
7. Working to eliminate laws and customs that impede social, economic, and political justice. (added in 1984)

=== Mixed success ===
The Sullivan principles were celebrated when introduced and gained wide use in the United States, particularly during the disinvestment campaign of the 1980s. Before the end of South Africa's apartheid era, the principles were formally adopted by more than 125 US corporations that had operations in South Africa. Of those companies that formally adopted the principles, at least 100 completely withdrew their existing operations from South Africa.

However, as South Africa's system of apartheid persisted relatively unchanged from the 1970s into the late 1980s, Sullivan "abandoned [his principles] as not going far enough" complaining that the principles by themselves were not enough to pressure a South African government steadfast in its refusal to yield to change.

== The global Sullivan principles ==
In 1999, more than 20 years after the adoption of the original Sullivan Principles and six years after the end of apartheid, the Rev. Leon Sullivan and United Nations Secretary General Kofi Annan together unveiled the new "Global Sullivan Principles".

The overarching objective of these principles, according to Leon Sullivan, is "to support economic, social and political justice by companies where they do business," including respect for human rights and equal work opportunities for all peoples.

=== The new principles ===
In general, the expanded corporate code of conduct requires adopting multinational companies to be a full participant in the advancement of human rights and social justice internationally.

The new principles read:

The Global Sullivan Principles

The Principles:

As a company which endorses the Global Sullivan Principles we will respect the law, and as a responsible member of society we will apply these Principles with integrity consistent with the legitimate role of business. We will develop and implement company policies, procedures, training and internal reporting structures to ensure commitment to these principles throughout our organisation. We believe the application of these Principles will achieve greater tolerance and better understanding among peoples, and advance the culture of peace.

Accordingly, we will:

1. Express our support for universal human rights and, particularly, those of our employees, the communities within which we operate, and parties with whom we do business.
2. Promote equal opportunity for our employees at all levels of the company with respect to issues such as color, race, gender, age, ethnicity or religious beliefs, and operate without unacceptable worker treatment such as the exploitation of children, physical punishment, female abuse, involuntary servitude, or other forms of abuse.
3. Respect our employees' voluntary freedom of association.
4. Compensate our employees to enable them to meet at least their basic needs and provide the opportunity to improve their skill and capability to raise their social and economic opportunities.
5. Provide a safe and healthy workplace; protect human health and the environment; and promote sustainable development.
6. Promote fair competition including respect for intellectual and other property rights, and not offer, pay or accept bribes.
7. Work with governments and communities in which we do business to improve the quality of life in those communities – their educational, cultural, economic and social well-being – and seek to provide training and opportunities for workers from disadvantaged backgrounds.
8. Promote the application of these principles by those with whom we do business.

We will be transparent in our implementation of these principles and provide information which demonstrates publicly our commitment to them.

== See also ==
- Disinvestment from South Africa
- Corporate social responsibility
- Leon Sullivan
- Socially responsible investing
- Corporate behavior
