= Terror-free investing =

Terror-free investing describes an investment strategy which seeks to maximize financial return while assuring investors that the financial instruments in the portfolio are "terror-free".

The Center for Security Policy, a Washington-based neoconservative think tank, is a major force behind the movement. "Terror-free investment is a train that we believe is picking up steam," according to Frank Gaffney, Jr., a Reagan-era Defense Department official, and president of the Center for Security Policy. Gaffney claims that one fifth of the portfolios of the largest American pension funds are in companies doing business in countries listed by the US as state sponsors of terrorism: Cuba, Iran, North Korea, Sudan, and Syria.

The Global Security Risk Monitor of the Conflict Securities Advisory Group is a research group established to attract clients interested in "Terror-Free Investing," by assuring them that none of their investments will aid groups or states that are considered by the US as sponsors of terrorism.

Eighteen American states have passed laws requiring the divestment of state pension funds from firms doing business with Iran, due in part to accusations that Iran supports terrorist organizations, and partially due to its controversial nuclear program.

== See also ==
- Socially responsible investing – Any investment strategy combining both financial performance and social/ethical impact
- Definition of terrorism
- List of designated terrorist organizations
- U.S. State Department list of Foreign Terrorist Organizations – U.S. government list of designated entities
- State Sponsors of Terrorism – U.S. designation applied to certain countries
