= Pax World Funds =

Financial services company

Pax World Management
- Company type: Subsidiary
- Industry: Investment management
- Founded: Portsmouth, New Hampshire (1971)
- Headquarters: Portsmouth, New Hampshire, U.S.
- Key people: Joseph Keefe, President; Steve Falci, Chief Investment Officer; Julie Fox Gorte, Ph.D. SVP for Sustainable Investing
- Products: Mutual funds, separately managed accounts
- Number of employees: 54
- Parent: Impax Asset Management Group
- Website: Paxworld.com

Pax World Funds ("Pax World") are advised by Impax Asset Management LLC, formerly Pax World Management LLC, a sustainable investment firm. It sells mutual funds, as well as separately managed accounts.

== History ==
Pax World launched the first socially responsible mutual fund in the United States in 1971.

The company was founded by Luther Tyson and Jack Corbett, both of whom had worked on peace, housing and employment issues for the United Methodist Church. Their vehicle, the first broadly diversified, publicly available mutual fund to use social as well as financial criteria in the investment decision-making process, was the Pax World Fund, predecessor of what is now the Pax World Balanced Fund.

In 2014, Pax World Management LLC and Ellevate Asset Management LLC, whose principal is Sallie Krawcheck, partnered to form Pax Ellevate Management. Pax Ellevate launched the Pax Ellevate Global Women’s Index Fund.

In 2018, Impax Asset Management Group plc acquired Pax World Management LLC, investment adviser to Pax World Funds.
