= Vitium Global Fund =

The Vice Fund (MUTF: VICEX), formerly the Barrier Fund, is a mutual fund investing in companies that have significant involvement in, or derive a substantial portion of their revenues from the tobacco, gambling, defense/aerospace, and alcohol industries, i.e., business devoted to behaviors that are traditionally regarded as morally questionable vices.

The fund has received a great deal of media coverage even in non-English magazines.

== History ==
The fund manager as of September 1, 2020 is Paul Strehle.

The fund was organized in March 2001 by USA Mutuals Advisors, Inc., which at the time was known as Mutuals.com. The fund's inception date was August 30, 2002. The Vice Fund invests at least 40% of its assets in foreign companies. Per the USA Mutuals website, The Vice Fund invests in domestic and foreign companies engaged in the aerospace and defense industries, owners and operators of casinos and gaming facilities, manufacturers of cigarettes and other tobacco products, and brewers, distillers, vintners and producers of other alcoholic beverages. These sectors have exhibited resilient demand through economic cycles and have fundamental strengths that help explain why they have endured for centuries. It also recently added marijuana and psychedelics to its holdings.
