= US SIF =

United States Sustainable Investment Forum

US SIF: The Sustainable Investment Forum is a US-based membership association located in Washington, DC. Its mission is to promote sustainable investing across all asset classes.

== Education ==
The US SIF Foundation's Center for Sustainable Investment Education provides education, research and thought leadership on sustainable investment to investors, investment advisors, consultants and analysts.

== Public policy ==
The US SIF Public Policy Program supports an agenda that advances sustainable investment to the national legislative and executive branches of government. Through US SIF, the sustainable investment industry brings a distinct voice and set of priorities to legislative and regulatory initiatives. Establishing standards for reporting and ESG analysis will likely need regulatory changes.

In an effort to counter pushback against ESG investing by Republican policy makers in 2022, US SIF published a detailed response to those attacks.

== Events ==
US SIF has organized an annual conference since 2011. Conferences are focused on a broad range of environmental, social and governance issues, centered on substantive sessions and networking opportunities.
