= Shareholder resolution =

Proposal submitted by shareholders

With respect to public companies in the United States, a shareholder resolution is a proposal submitted by shareholders for a vote at the company's annual meeting. Typically, resolutions are opposed by the corporation's management, hence the insistence for a vote. "Voting has long been recognized as one of the primary rights of shareholders." For publicly held corporations in the United States, the submission and handling of resolutions is regulated by the Securities and Exchange Commission (SEC).

Shareholders submit resolutions dealing primarily with corporate governance, such as executive compensation, or corporate social responsibility issues, such as global warming, labor relations, tobacco smoking, human rights, and animal welfare.

Virtually all shareholder resolutions are non-binding (or "precatory", to use the legal term of art). In this sense the voting on these resolutions more closely resembles a poll than it does a (binding) referendum or plebiscite. Still, media coverage of voting on shareholder resolutions tends to focus on whether the proposal received a majority of votes, which occurs in a very small but increasing proportion of cases. According to SEC rules, defeated resolutions may be resubmitted only if they pass certain election hurdles (percentage of affirmative votes).

Shareholder resolutions have been an important part of activist campaigns in several cases. For example, resolutions were effective at raising public awareness and thereby pressuring corporate management about investments in apartheid South Africa, nuclear power, and labor disputes. Given these results, resolutions have been spearheaded by several coordinating groups, including the AFL–CIO and the Interfaith Center on Corporate Responsibility. Governmental and labor union pension funds also have become involved in supporting and submitting shareholder resolutions.

A shareholder resolution to protest napalm manufacturer Dow Chemical resulted in the U.S. Supreme Court case SEC v. Medical Committee for Human Rights, 404 U.S. 403 (1972). The court decided that the case was moot due to Dow's agreeing to include the resolution on its proxy statement. The dissent argument by Justice Douglas encourages the SEC to facilitate more shareholder resolutions. "The philosophy of our times, I think, requires that such [404 U.S. 403, 410] enterprises be held to a higher standard than that of the "morals of the marketplace" which exalts a single-minded, myopic determination to maximize profits as the traditional be-all and end-all of corporate concern."

== Sources ==
- AFL-CIO. "How to File a Shareholder Resolution"
- Gartman, Grant A. The IRRC handbook on proxy voting duties and guideline development. 1999
- Gray, Hillel. New Directions in the Investment and Control of Pension Funds. DC: Investor Responsibility Research Center, 1983.
- Medical Committee for Human Rights v. SEC 432 F.2d 639 (DC Cir. 1970, cert. granted) 401 US 973 (1971)
- SEC Shareholder Proposals Staff Legal Bulletin No. 14B, September 15, 2004
- Shareholder Activism IRRC
- Simon, Powers and Gunnemann. The Ethical Investor Yale Univ. Press
- Voorhes, Meg. "The Rising Tide of Shareholder Activism" DC: IRRC, 2005
