= Interfaith Center on Corporate Responsibility =

The Interfaith Center on Corporate Responsibility (ICCR) is an association advocating for corporate social responsibility. Its 300 member organizations comprise faith communities, asset managers, unions, pensions, NGOs and other investors. ICCR members engage hundreds of corporations annually in an effort to foster greater corporate accountability. ICCR's members file shareholder resolutions on issues such as climate change, human rights, corporate governance, financial practices, and other social and environmental concerns. The organization was founded in 1971.

ICCR also owns the EthVest database of shareholder resolutions.

== Members ==
ICCR members include faith communities, asset management companies, labor unions, pension funds, NGOs, and college and university endowment funds.

== Issues of concern ==
Shareholder resolutions span a wide range of issues. In recent years, the most active issues have included climate change; human rights including topics such as human trafficking, food safety and sustainability, water sustainability, and the affordability of medicines; corporate lobbying and corporate political contributions; corporate governance; financial practices and risk; and gun control.

The Interfaith Center on Corporate Responsibility co-ordinated organizations using shareholder activism to influence firearms manufacturers to improve the safety of their products. The Interfaith Center on Corporate Responsibility supported shareholder resolutions asking American Outdoor Brands Corporation, the parent company of Smith & Wesson, and Sturm, Ruger & Co. to report to investors regarding the steps they are taking to reduce gun violence. Ruger opposed the resolution. BlackRock, the world's largest asset manager and Ruger's largest investor, and Institutional Shareholder Services and Glass Lewis, the two most important shareholder advisory firms in the United States, supported the resolution. At Ruger's annual meeting on May 9, 2018, a majority of shareholders voted in favor and Ruger said they would heed the resolution. The Brady Campaign to Prevent Gun Violence called the vote a "first-of-its-kind victory."
