= White South African refugee program =

2025 asylum initiative in the United States

In February 2025, a refugee program officially known as Mission South Africa was launched by United States president Donald Trump under Executive Order 14204 to grant refugee status to white South Africans and other minorities in South Africa, primarily Afrikaners, under claims of systemic violence and racial discrimination linked to South Africa's post-apartheid land reform policies. The Trump administration attempted to justify the program by falsely alleging that White South African farmers were victims of what it described as a "genocide" and state-backed persecution.

The initiative was met with strong opposition from the South African government. South African president Cyril Ramaphosa rejected the premise of the program, arguing that the white minority was not facing persecution that would meet the threshold for refugee status under international law.

By August 2026, nearly 13,000 South Africans had been admitted to the United States, while reports the following month indicated that an unknown number of applicants had also been rejected, in some cases without a clear explanation.

== Background ==
Racial discrimination and inequality against Black, Coloured, and Indian people in South Africa dates to the beginning of large-scale European colonization of South Africa with the Dutch East India Company's establishment of a trading post in the Cape of Good Hope in 1652, which eventually expanded into the Dutch Cape Colony. The company began the Khoikhoi–Dutch Wars in which it displaced the local Khoikhoi people, replaced them with farms worked by White settlers, and imported Black slaves from across the Dutch colonial empire.

Serious political violence was a prominent feature from 1985 to 1989, as Black townships became the focus of the struggle between anti-apartheid organizations and the Botha government. Black town councillors and policemen, and sometimes their families, were attacked with petrol bombs, beaten, and murdered by necklacing, where a burning tyre was placed around the victim's neck, after they were restrained by wrapping their wrists with barbed wire. Detention without trial became a common feature of the government's reaction to growing civil unrest and by 1988, 30,000 people had been detained. The media was censored, thousands were arrested and many were interrogated and tortured.

On January 23, 2025, South African President Cyril Ramaphosa signed into law the Expropriation Act permitting the state to seize property without compensation in certain cases. South African officials framed it as an attempt to address the negative effects of apartheid. Proponents of the bill point to the fact that white South Africans own farmland covering half the country, despite constituting 7% of the population, a false claim when reviewing the South African Land Audit Report 2017 that shows white South Africans own 22% of land, while 23% is state-owned and 60% is owned by companies, community-based organizations and trusts where racial ownership is not specified in the audit.

=== United States ===
Upon assuming office on January 20, 2025, President Trump signed an executive order suspending the entry of refugees into the United States through the U.S. Refugee Admissions Program. The order, Executive Order 14163, allowed the Secretary of State and the Secretary of Homeland Security to jointly admit individual refugees on a case-by-case basis if they decided that doing so was in the national interest. On February 7, 2025, Trump signed Executive Order 14204, halting U.S. foreign aid to South Africa, claiming that its government had been engaging in "race-based discrimination". and systemic violence. In that same executive order, he said that the U.S. would "promote the resettlement of Afrikaner refugees escaping government-sponsored race-based discrimination, including racially discriminatory property confiscation", and grant Afrikaners rapid pathways to citizenship.

Trump had also falsely raised claims during his first term that white South African farmers were supposedly being killed in large numbers, a claim also echoed by Elon Musk, who falsely described it as a genocide. However, updated statistics published by the New York Times show 101 of 225 people killed on farms in South Africa between April 2020 and March 2024 were black workers. There are roughly 26,000 people murdered each year in South Africa with about 0.1% on farms and most of those victims identified as black.

In March 2025, Secretary of State Marco Rubio declared South African Ambassador to the United States Ebrahim Rasool persona non grata for criticizing Trump's 2024 presidential campaign and policies.

== Implementation ==
In March 2025, the U.S. Department of State said that it had received 8,000 inquiries into the refugee program. According to reports, the U.S. Embassy in Pretoria had been conducting interviews and processing families, while State Department officials began chartering planes for the families scheduled to leave South Africa.

On May 12, 2025, the first group of 59 white South Africans arrived in Dulles in northern Virginia under the program. They were welcomed at Dulles International Airport by U.S. officials, including Deputy Secretary of State Christopher Landau, and were provided with resettlement assistance. According to the State Department, all spoke English, and about a third already had relatives in the United States. The refugee applications of the Afrikaner minority were expedited by the Trump administration, which cited "racial discrimination" as the justification for granting priority status.

On June 2, 2025, U.S. officials reported that a second group of nine white South Africans arrived a few days prior.

In October 2025, the Trump administration announced that it was restricting the number of refugees admitted annually into the United States at 7,500 for the 2026 budget year. There was no mention of any other specific groups to be admitted outside of white South Africans.

Between October 2025 and March 2026, 4,499 refugees were admitted into the U.S.; all but three were white South Africans, with over half arriving in February and March; by August 2026, that number increased to a total of 12,901 South Africans (and only three refugees from Afghanistan).

By mid-2026, dozens of applicants to the White South African refugee program had been rejected, although the total number of unsuccessful applications was unclear. Some rejection notices cited criminal histories or public-safety concerns, and the decisions could not be appealed.

== Legal basis and litigation ==
The program runs through the United States Refugee Admissions Program (USRAP), the federal system for resettling refugees that Congress created in the Refugee Act of 1980. Under that law, the president decides each year how many refugees the country will accept. For the 2026 fiscal year, Trump set that limit at 7,500 and said the places would "primarily be allocated among Afrikaners from South Africa." In May 2026, he declared an "emergency refugee situation" and raised the limit to 17,500, with the 10,000 extra places reserved for Afrikaners. Because Executive Order 14163 had paused most other refugee admissions, nearly all refugees admitted during this period were white South Africans.

Executive Order 14204 directs the State Department and the Department of Homeland Security to give priority to Afrikaners who are victims of what the order calls "unjust racial discrimination," including by admitting and resettling them as refugees through USRAP.

=== Pacito v. Trump ===
The main court challenge to the refugee suspension is Pacito v. Trump, a class-action lawsuit filed on February 10, 2025, in federal court in Seattle (the United States District Court for the Western District of Washington). The plaintiffs include refugees who had been approved to come to the United States but had not yet arrived, along with three refugee resettlement organizations: HIAS, Church World Service, and Lutheran Community Services Northwest. The lead plaintiff, a Congolese refugee living in Kenya, had sold his belongings and given up his home before his January 2025 flight to the United States was canceled; he and his family then slept in the parking lot of a transit center in Nairobi. He was resettled in North Carolina in July 2025.

The lawsuit named Trump and the heads of the State Department, the Department of Homeland Security, and the Department of Health and Human Services. It argued that Trump's order went beyond the power Congress gave the president under the Refugee Act and federal immigration law, and that the agencies broke the Administrative Procedure Act, the law that sets rules for how federal agencies make decisions, when they stopped processing refugees and cut off funding to resettlement groups.

In February and March 2025, U.S. District Judge Jamal Whitehead issued orders temporarily blocking the suspension, finding that it was likely unlawful. On March 5, 2026, a three-judge panel of the U.S. Court of Appeals for the Ninth Circuit reversed most of those orders. Writing for the majority, Judge Jay Bybee concluded that the president likely does have the power to pause refugee admissions, relying on a federal law that lets the president suspend the entry of any group of foreigners whose entry would be "detrimental to the interests of the United States." The court did, however, require the government to keep paying for basic resettlement services for refugees who had already arrived in the country. Judge Kenneth Lee disagreed with that part of the ruling, arguing that the resettlement groups' funding claims belonged in a different court and that the government had discretion over that funding.

=== Challenge to the Afrikaner program ===
After the appeals court ruled, the plaintiffs asked on April 7, 2026, to update their lawsuit so that it directly challenged the government's treatment of Afrikaners. The updated complaint alleges that the government gave more than 3,000 white Afrikaners exceptions to the refugee suspension while refusing to consider other refugees for exceptions; that it wrongly applied a separate travel ban to refugees, even though the ban contains an exception for them; and that it used the 2026 refugee limit to admit only white Afrikaners and other non-Black South Africans. A lawyer for the plaintiffs said the government had created "a shadow refugee program for white Afrikaners while excluding refugees that Congress has prioritized," including close family members of refugees already in the United States, Iraqis with ties to the U.S. government, and Iranian religious minorities.

The court allowed the updated complaint on June 15, 2026, and it was filed the next day. The government asked the court to dismiss the case on June 30, 2026.

== Trump–Ramaphosa Oval Office meeting ==
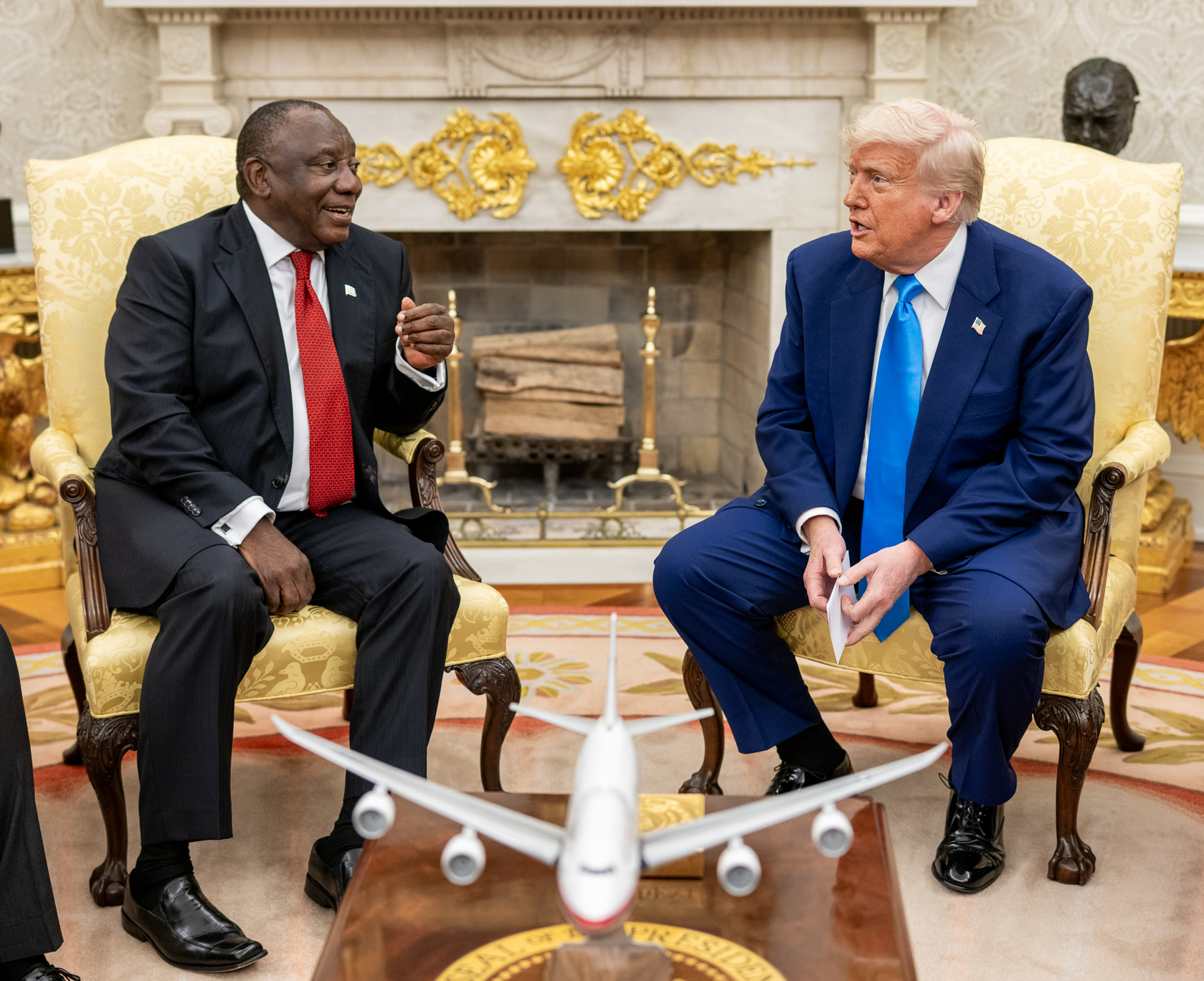
Trump meets with South African President Cyril Ramaphosa in the Oval Office on May 21, 2025.

On May 21, 2025, South African president Ramaphosa made a state visit to the United States to meet with President Trump. During a press conference, Trump confronted Ramaphosa with false claims of white genocide against Afrikaners in South Africa, which Ramaphosa strongly denied. During the meeting Trump displayed an aerial shot of thousands of white crosses lining the side of a rural road, that he termed a burial site of thousands of Afrikaners that had been murdered. While Trump did not indicate where the road was, local South Africans identified the site as a roadside memorial for two Afrikaner farmers that were murdered five years prior along with all murder victims that occurred on farms regardless of skin color.

Trump also played two separate clips to Ramaphosa of two controversial South African opposition politicians, including Julius Malema, leader of the minority EFF party, singing songs that were popular during the struggle against apartheid, such as "Kill the Boer," which called for violence against the descendants of Boers. Trump printed out articles in which he claimed showed death and violence but were found by third party checkers were either unsubstantiated, from partisan blog postings or the wrong country. The following day, a screenshot Trump displayed during the meeting which he claimed showed "all white farmers that are being buried" was revealed to be taken from a Reuters video shot in the Democratic Republic of Congo, following a rebel offensive in Goma.

== Reactions ==
=== Support ===
Trump defended his actions, falsely stating that "it's a genocide that's taking place" and added, "Farmers are being killed, they happen to be white, but whether they're white or black makes no difference to me."

A senior advisor to the president at the time, Elon Musk—a white South African himself—amplified the false claims of "white genocide" in South Africa.

Deputy Secretary of State Christopher Landau welcomed the Afrikaners, saying that they were experiencing "threatening invasions of their homes" and that they could easily assimilate into American culture.

A white South African farmer who lost seven farms to droughts and bad business decisions, was angered by the allegedly racist South African Expropriation Act and by actions of the banks. He said that the program was a "fantastic opportunity" for him and his family. The farmer is part of a group of Trump-supporting white South Africans, such as social media influencer Willem Petzer, who stated "With the support of the West, we can make South Africa great again". One white South African refugee in the US said that due to the new land rules "Your land becomes worthless" and that he had fled due to threats on WhatsApp, machinery being damaged, and local police reportedly failing to act on reports.

=== Opposition ===
Several Democrats have condemned the resettlement plan, including Maryland senator Chris Van Hollen, who described it as part of the Trump administration's "global apartheid policy". New Hampshire senator Jeanne Shaheen called it an attempt to "rewrite history." Gregory Meeks of the House Foreign Affairs Committee said it is "not just a racist dog whistle, it's a politically motivated rewrite of history".

The Episcopal Church of the US responded by terminating their partnership with the federal government, as they were morally opposed to resettling the white Afrikaners.

South African officials claimed that the initiative was "politically motivated and designed to question South Africa's constitutional democracy", citing Trump's criticism of South Africa's ties to Iran and its genocide case against Israel at the International Court of Justice. Ramaphosa criticized the U.S. assessment as "not true". He also criticized the white South Africans that resettled in the U.S., calling them "cowards" and stating that "they'll be back soon."

A group of prominent Afrikaners, including business leaders, academics, and descendants of apartheid-era figures led by Piet Croucamp and others, wrote an open letter, rejecting Trump's assertions that there was systematic persecution of white South Africans. The letter "Not in Our Name", which garnered 1,500 signatures in a week, was sent to multiple US senators and raised challenges to Trump's claims, writing that white Afrikaners are not under any "existential threat". A white South African farmer stated that those who went to the US were "not real farmers" and were just "opportunists." Writer Max du Preez, who is descended from a long line of Afrikaners, wrote a piece in The Guardian slamming the move, pointing out that "South Africa's progressive constitution with its extensive bill of rights is intact; the rule of law is maintained, and the judiciary is independent and functioning; we are a genuinely open society with free speech and media that many other democracies, especially Trump's America, can be jealous of".

== See also ==
- South African Americans, over 100,000 people born in South Africa live in the United States
- Immigration policy of the second Donald Trump administration
- South African farm attacks
- Racism in South Africa
- South Africa–United States relations § Second presidency of Donald Trump
- White flight
