= South Africa–United States relations =

- South Africa: United States

Diplomatic mission
- Embassy of South Africa, Washington, D.C.: Embassy of the United States, Pretoria

Envoy
- Ambassador Roelf Meyer: Ambassador Brent Bozell III

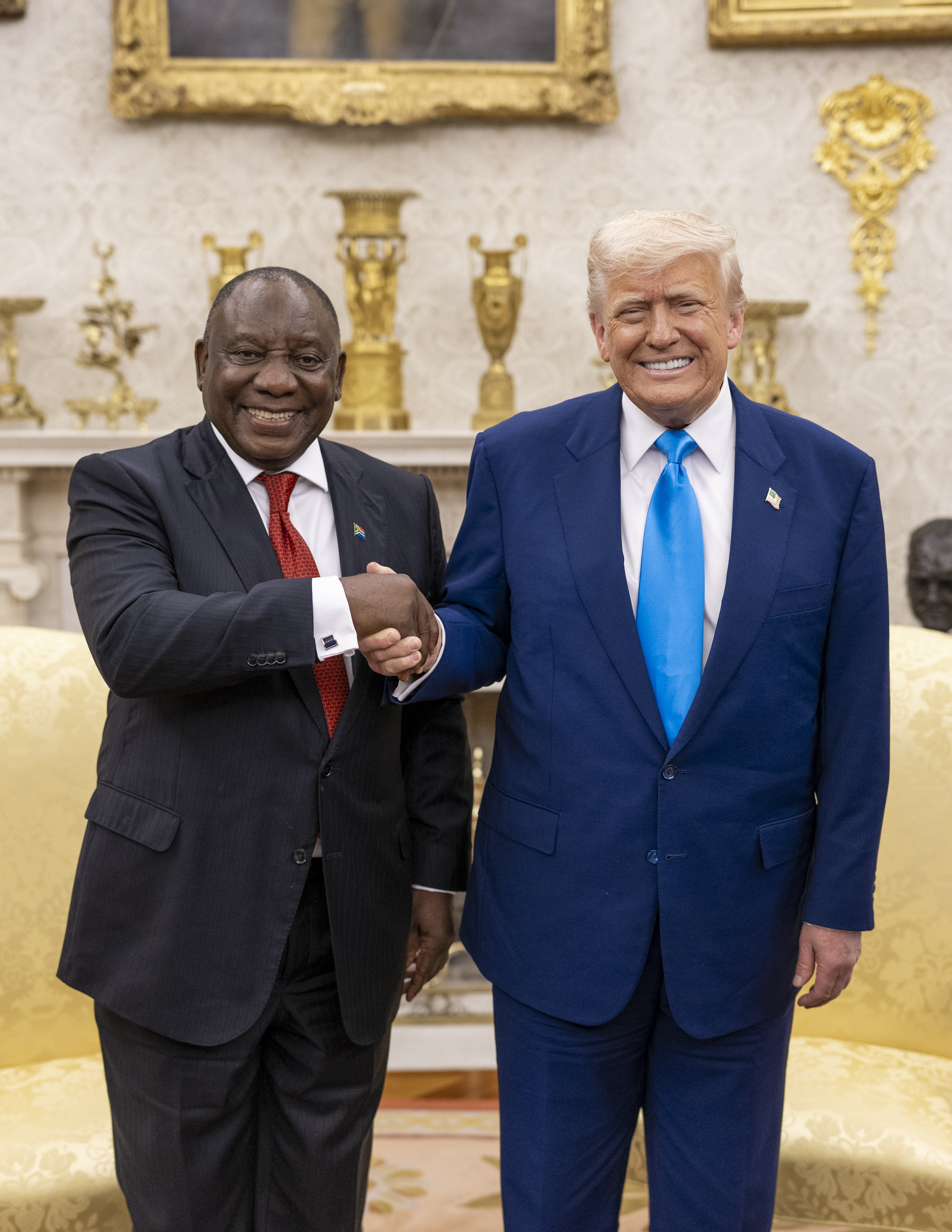
South Africa's Incumbent President Cyril Ramaphosa and U.S. President Donald Trump.

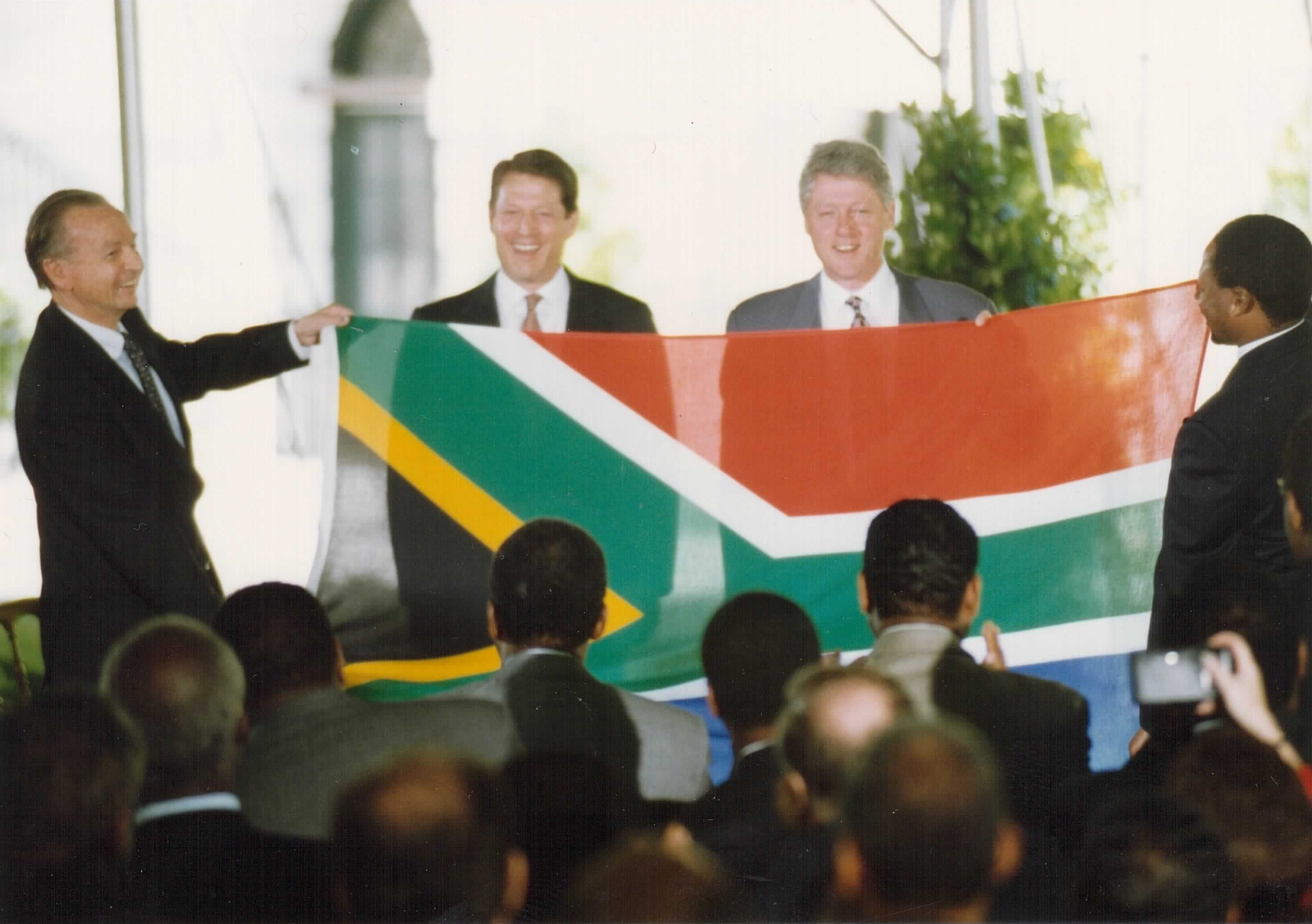
South African Ambassador Harry Schwarz unveiling the new South African flag to U.S. President Bill Clinton in May 1994

The United States and South Africa currently maintain strong bilateral relations with one another. The United States and South Africa have been economically linked to one another since the late 18th century which has continued into the 21st century. United States and South Africa relations faced periods of strain throughout the 20th century due to the segregationist, white minority rule in South Africa, from 1948 to 1994. Following the end of apartheid in South Africa, the United States and South Africa have developed a strategically, politically, and economically beneficial relationship with one another and currently enjoy "cordial relations" despite "occasional strains". South Africa remains the United States' largest trading partner in Africa as of 2019.

== History ==
The United States has maintained an official presence in South Africa since 1799 when an American consulate was opened in Cape Town. The U.S. Embassy is located in Pretoria, and Consulates General are in Johannesburg, Durban and Cape Town.

=== Boer War ===
The United States remained formally neutral during the Second Boer War. Although the U.S. press and the administration of President William McKinley favored the British Empire, many Americans sympathized with the Boer republics and some traveled to South Africa to fight as foreign volunteers in the conflict. Some of these American volunteers were taken as prisoners-of-war by the British, leading to a minor diplomatic crisis until negotiations between U.S. Secretary of State John Hay and British Foreign Secretary Lord Lansdowne led to their repatriation in 1902.

=== Union of South Africa ===
During World War I both countries fought for the Allied Powers, and U.S. President Woodrow Wilson and South African Prime Minister Jan Smuts formed a friendship at the Paris Peace Conference. Initially Smuts opposed Wilson's proposal for the League of Nations, but by the beginning of the conference shifted into one of its strongest proponents. In 1929, the United States and the Union of South Africa established official diplomatic relations. However, following World War II, both the United States and South Africa had political affairs that impacted their relations with all of the world. The United States had entered into the Cold War with the Soviet Union; while, simultaneously, the National Party in South Africa won the 1948 general election against its rival, the United Party. With the National Party in power, this meant that the segregationist policies that had been impacting South Africa had become lawful, and the Apartheid Era had begun. Due to this, the United States policies towards South Africa were altered; and, overall, the relation between South Africa and the United States was strained until the end of apartheid rule. Following the Apartheid Era, the United States and South Africa have maintained bilateral relations.

=== Apartheid Era ===
The apartheid era began under the rule of the National Party which was elected into power in the 1948 general election. President Harry S. Truman was moderately supportive of the civil rights movement, but supported the new government as an anti-communist ally against the Soviet Union. Throughout the Apartheid Era, United States foreign policy was heavily influenced by the Cold War. During the early period of apartheid in South Africa, the United States maintained friendly relations with South Africa, which may be attributed to the anti-communist ideals held by the National Party. However, over the course of the 20th century, American-South African relations were impacted by the apartheid system in place under the National Party. At times, the United States cooperated with and maintained bilateral relations with South Africa; and, at other times, the United States took political action against it.

South Africa–United States relations

- South Africa: United States

==== Cooperation ====
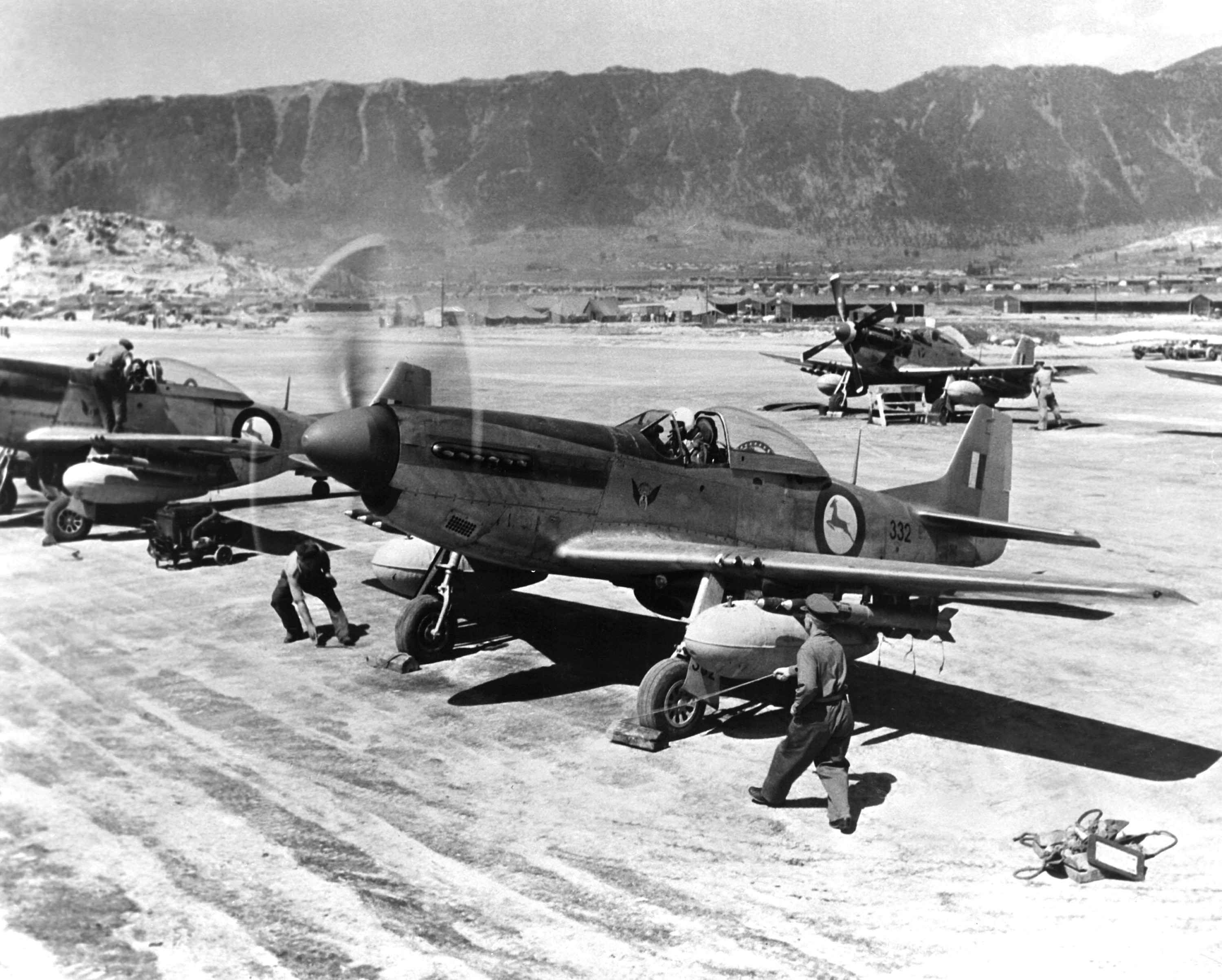
South African Air Force 2 Squadron Mustang fighters during the Korean War in the early 1950s.

Throughout the Apartheid Era, economic ties between the United States and South Africa played a prominent role in their relations with one another. From the 1950s to the 1980s, United States exports to, imports from, and direct investment in South Africa as a whole increased. South Africa was seen as an important trade partner because it provided the United States with access to various mineral resources— like chromium, manganese, vanadium— vital for the U.S. steel industry. Aside from trade and investment, South Africa also provided a strategic location for a naval base and access to much of the African continent. In addition, the United States had a NASA missile tracking station located in South Africa, which became controversial in American politics due to segregation being practiced on the stations in compliance with apartheid policy. In the early 1950s the South African Air Force supported the United States during the Korean War by fighting on the side of the United Nations Command. Donald Rickard, a former US vice-consul in Durban and CIA operative, admitted that the United States believed Nelson Mandela was under the control of the Soviet Union and therefore gave the intelligence tip that led to his 1962 capture and subsequent 27-year incarceration by the Apartheid regime.

==== Resistance ====
Following the Sharpeville Massacre in 1960, the United States relations with South Africa began to undergo changes. In 1963, under the Kennedy administration, the United States voluntarily placed an arms embargo on South Africa in cooperation with the United Nations Security Council Resolution 181. After President Kennedy's assassination and under Lyndon B. Johnson, the United States policy towards South Africa was greatly impacted by the Civil Rights Movement taking place at home. In regards to the African struggles in Africa, President Johnson shared that:

The foreign policy of the United States is rooted in its life at home. We will not permit human rights to be restricted in our own country. And we will not support policies abroad which are based on the rule of minorities or the discredited notion that men are unequal before the law. We will not live by a double standard—professing abroad what we do not practice at home, or venerating at home what we ignore abroad.

The primary political action taken by the Johnson administration was the implementation of National Security Action Memorandum 295 in 1963. This, in short, aimed to promote change in apartheid policy in South Africa whilst still maintaining economic relations. Similarly, in 1968, the Johnson Administration created a National Policy Paper which discussed the U.S. political objectives of balancing a bilateral economic relation with South Africa, while also promoting the end of apartheid in South Africa.

Despite rhetorical opposition to apartheid, the United States continued to block sanctions against South Africa at the United Nations in the 1960s and the 1970s. Although controversial, most scholars agree that Richard Nixon and Gerald R. Ford failed to combat apartheid policy in South Africa. President Jimmy Carter is known for his confrontational strategy against apartheid and white rule in South Africa. However, although the Carter administration advocated for human rights in South Africa, most scholars agree that it was unsuccessful in creating change in South Africa. The Carter administration feared that divestment of American companies in South Africa could have worsened the conditions for the black majority, while strengthening the position of the white minority in South Africa. This resulted in the Carter administration refraining from placing sanctions—often promoted by the anti-apartheid movement—on South Africa, and led to growth in investments in South Africa.

Throughout the Johnson, Nixon, Ford, and Carter administrations, the United States anti-apartheid movement as well as divestment from South Africa campaigns increasingly gained support from the American public. The growth of the anti-apartheid movement as well as the divestment campaign lead to increased pressure on the U.S. government to take action against apartheid policy in South Africa. It is during this time— when these movements had more support than ever before— that the Reagan administration came into office.

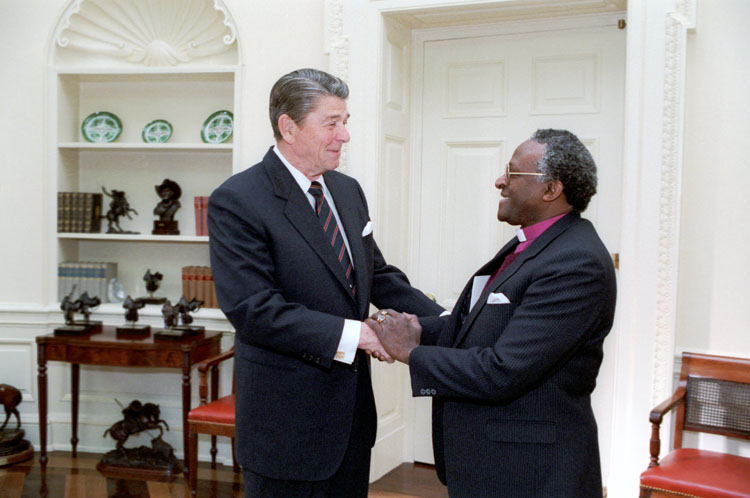
President Reagan meeting with the anti-apartheid activist Bishop Desmond Tutu in the oval office in 1984. The Reagan administration followed a policy of constructive engagement with the apartheid government in South Africa. The United States Congress forced a change in policy by imposing sanctions on the apartheid government in 1986.

President Ronald Reagan practiced a policy of "constructive engagement" to gently push South Africa toward a moral racially sensitive regime. The policy had been developed by State Department official Chester Crocker as part of a larger policy of cooperation with South Africa to address regional turmoil. It also supported South Africa in the South African Border War and the Angolan Civil War, in which Cuba had intervened to assist the MPLA. However, anger was growing in the United States, with leaders in both parties calling for sanctions to punish South Africa. Lawrence Eagleburger, Reagan's Under Secretary of State for Political Affairs, in June 1983 announced a clear shift in policy to an insistence upon fundamental change in Pretoria's racial policy, as the Reagan administration had to confront growing congressional and public support for sanctions. The new policy was inadequate to such anti-apartheid leaders as Archbishop Desmond Tutu. Weeks after it was announced that he had been awarded the 1984 Nobel Peace Prize he went to the United States and denounced the Reagan administration's policy as inherently immoral. On 4 December 1984, he told the U.S. House Subcommittee on Africa:

Apartheid is an evil as immoral and unchristian in my view as Nazism, and in my view the Reagan administration's support in collaboration with it is equally immoral, evil, and totally unchristian, without remainder.

However, on 7 December, Tutu met face-to-face with Reagan at the White House. They agreed that apartheid was repugnant and should be dismantled by peaceful means. Because efforts at constructive engagement had not succeeded in altering South Africa's policy of apartheid, Washington D.C. had to adapt this policy. In 1986, despite President Reagan's effort to veto it, the Comprehensive Anti-Apartheid Act of 1986 (CAAA) was enacted by United States Congress. This act was the first in this era that not only implemented economic sanctions, but also offered to aid to the victims living under apartheid rule. The Comprehensive Anti-Apartheid Act was the starting point for unified policy towards South Africa in United States politics. Under the Reagan, Clinton, and Bush administrations, there were continued efforts to try to end apartheid. These efforts gained more traction after the end of the Cold War and the Cuban withdrawal from the Angolan Civil War, which removed the United States's incentive to support the apartheid regime. By 1994, apartheid in South Africa had officially ended. Nelson Mandela was elected as the first president of this newly democratic nation.

=== Post-apartheid ===
Since 2004, the US funded PEPFAR program has helped to stabilize the AIDS pandemic in South Africa.

Since the abolition of apartheid and the first-ever democratic elections of April 1994, the United States has enjoyed a bilateral relation with South Africa. Although there are differences of position between the two governments (regarding Iraq, for example), they have not impeded cooperation on a broad range of key issues. Bilateral cooperation in counter-terrorism, fighting HIV/AIDS, and military relations has been particularly positive. Through the U.S. Agency for International Development (USAID), the United States also provides assistance to South Africa to help them meet their developmental goals. Peace Corps volunteers began working in South Africa in 1997.

Harry Schwarz, who served as South African Ambassador to the United States during its transition to representative democracy (1991–1994), has been credited as having played one of the leading roles in the renewal of relations between the two nations. South African journalist Peter Fabricius described Schwarz as having "engineered a state of US/South Africa relations better than it has ever been". The fact that Schwarz, for decades a well known anti-apartheid figurehead, was willing to accept the position was widely acknowledged as a highly symbolic demonstration of President F. W de Klerk's determination to introduce a new democratic system. During Schwarz's tenure, he negotiated the lifting of US sanctions against South Africa, secured a $600 million aid package from President Bill Clinton, signed the Nuclear Non-Proliferation Treaty in 1991 and hosted President Mandela's state visit to the US in October 1994.

During the presidency of Thabo Mbeki (1999–2008) relations were strained due to a combination of the ANC's paranoia around alleged CIA activities in the country and perceived criticism of Mbeki's AIDS denialism, a feeling partly based on the ANC's experiences of tacit American support for the Apartheid government during the Reagan administration. The Bush administration's wars in Afghanistan and Iraq as well as its PEPFAR initiative (that clashed with Mbeki's views on AIDS) served to alienate the South African presidency until president Mbeki left government in 2008. Until 2008, the United States had officially considered Nelson Mandela a terrorist, however on 5 July 2008 Mandela along with other ANC members including the then current foreign minister were removed from a US terrorist watch list.

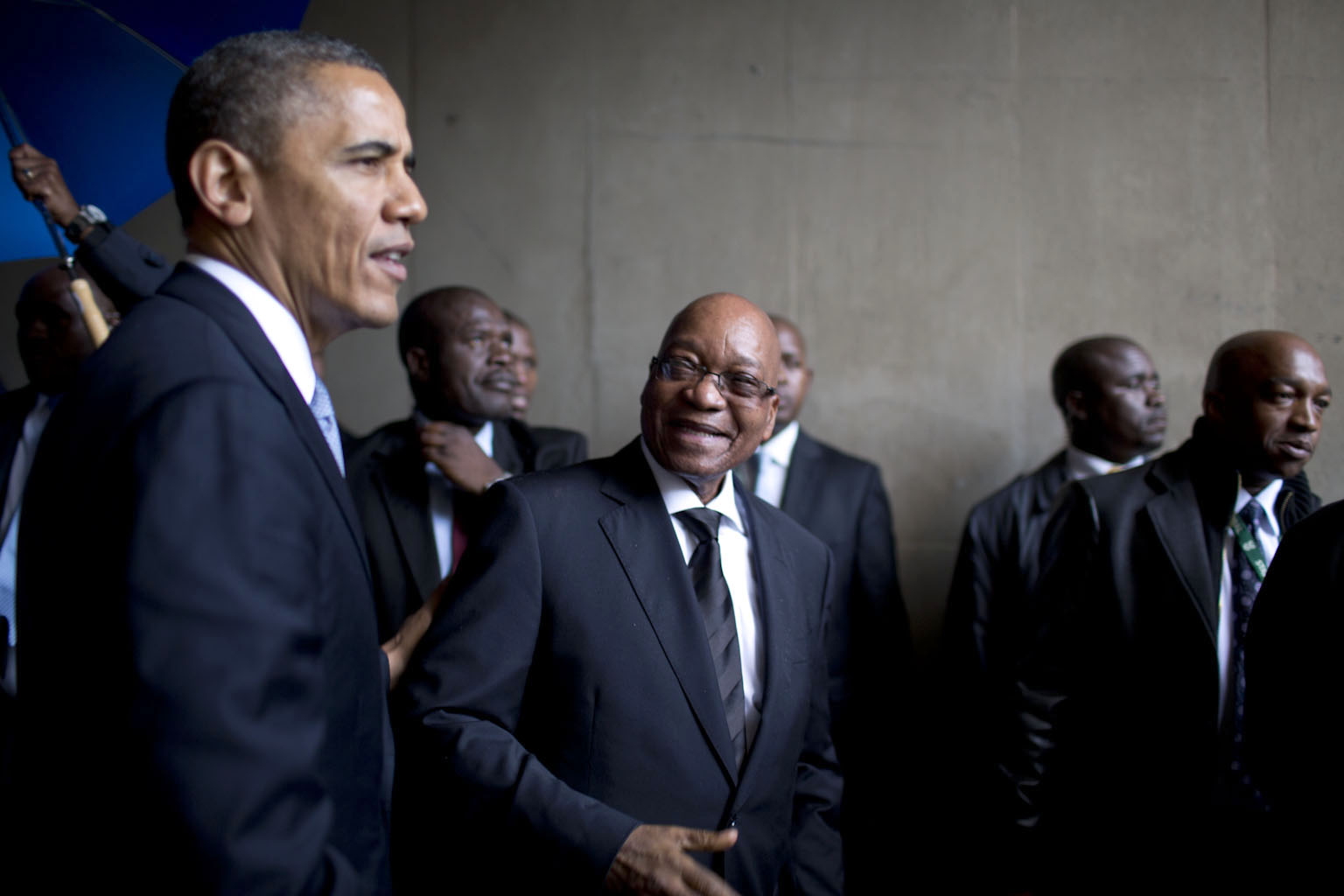
President Barack Obama with President Jacob Zuma at the funeral of Nelson Mandela

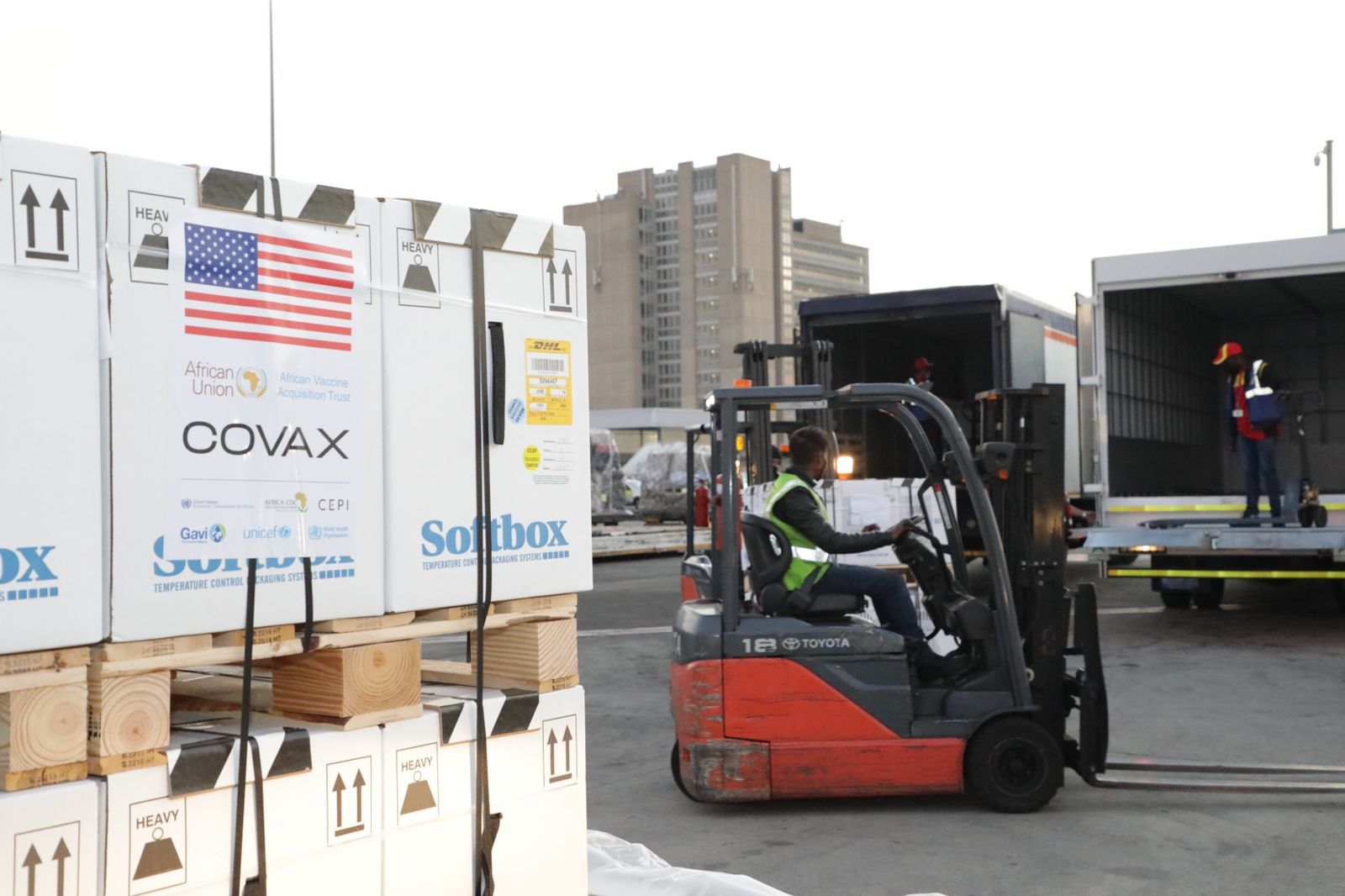
The US delivers Pfizer COVID-19 vaccines to South Africa as part of the COVAX initiative in 2021

On 28 January 2009, newly elected US President Barack Obama telephoned his newly installed counterpart Kgalema Motlanthe as one of a list of foreign contacts he had been working through since his presidential inauguration the previous week. Given primary treatment was South Africa's role in helping to resolve the political crisis in Zimbabwe. According to White House spokesman Robert Gibbs, the pair "shared concerns" on the matter. Obama credited South Africa for holding "a key role" in resolving the Zimbabwean crisis, and said that he was looking forward to working with President Motlanthe to address global financial issues at the 2009 G-20 London summit.

The election of Obama along with Mbeki's departure from office as well as the enactment of the African Growth and Opportunity Act (AGOA) with South Africa as a key beneficiary greatly improved opinions within the South African government of its relation with the United States. As of 2014 the relation between South Africa and the United States in the Zuma/Obama years is thought not to be as close as it was during the Mandela/Clinton years but greatly improved since the Mbeki/Bush years. The Zuma years coincided with a continuation of cooling of South Africa–United States relations whilst China–South Africa relations warmed significantly as South Africa focused diplomatic efforts supporting the BRICS initiative.

During the first Trump administration relations between the two countries cooled again due to President Donald Trump's comments on South African land reform policies, farm attacks and the listing of South Africa as one of ten countries with the "worst record" of supporting US positions in the United Nations. The publication of the list was accompanied with the statement that the Trump administration was considering cutting off American aid to listed countries such as South Africa.

==== Relations following Russia's 2022 invasion of Ukraine ====
Russia's 2022 invasion of Ukraine added additional tensions to bilateral relations between the two countries. The United States strongly supported Ukraine, criticized Russia's invasion and has given the country significant military aid; whilst South Africa officially adopted a neutral or non-aligned policy that was friendlier towards Russia by being critical of punitive economic sanctions imposed on Russia, avoiding criticizing Russia's actions, and calling for a negotiated compromise between the waring sides that took into consideration Russia's security concerns. South Africa's stance caused concern amongst American policy makers, nevertheless South African President Cyril Ramaphosa met with U.S. President Joe Biden at the White House in September 2022.

Relations further worsened in December 2022 and into 2023 when South Africa allowed the US-sanctioned Russian cargo ship (the Lady R) carrying an unknown cargo to secretly dock at the Simon's Town naval base, hosted a naval exercise (Mosi II) with Russia and China that coincided with the one year anniversary of Russia's invasion of Ukraine, and allowed the secretive landing of a US-sanctioned Russian cargo aircraft at the Waterkloof Air Force Base. This also included South Africa's hosting of a BRICS conference in August 2023 with the intention that Vladimir Putin would attend despite South Africa's possible legal obligation to arrest him to face charges of causing human rights violations in Ukraine.

This period overlapped with the troubled ambassadorship of Nomaindiya Mfeketo to the United States.

===== Lady R incident =====
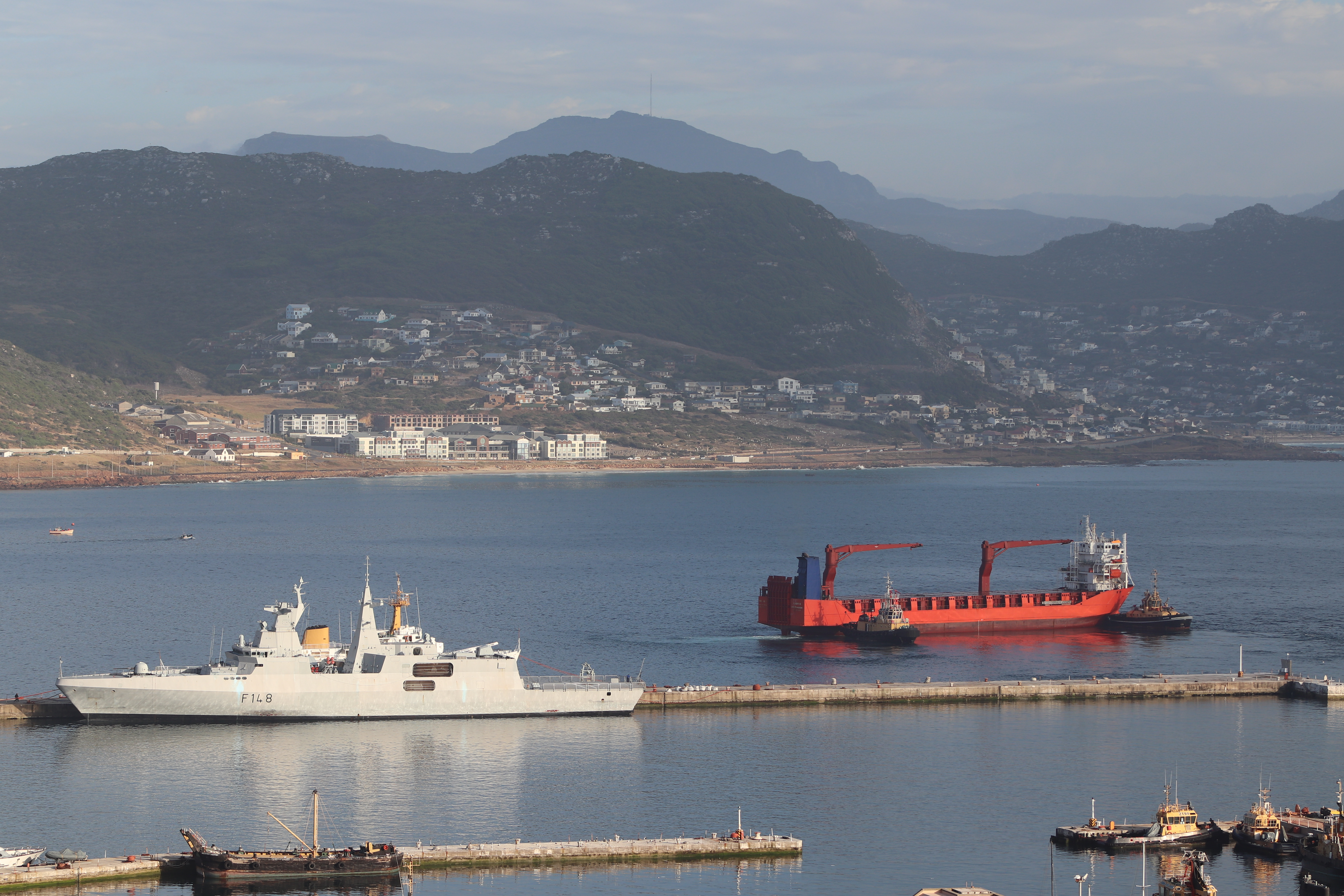
The Lady R (vessel with the red hull, right) leaving Naval Base Simon's Town.

In May 2023 US ambassador Reuben Brigety accused South Africa of supplying weapons and ammunition to Russia during the docking of the Lady R in December 2022, that the governing African National Congress (ANC) had been unresponsive to American attempts at dialogue and that the ANC's policy document on the Russian invasion of Ukraine was "hostile" to America's position on the issue. South Africa denied supplying arms to Russia, démarched ambassador Brigety and stated that he had apologized for the statement.

These actions further complicated South Africa's relationship with the US and other Western countries whilst increasing skepticism of South Africa's self-proclaimed non-aligned or neutral position on the war in Ukraine.

In June 2023, a group of US lawmakers asked the Biden administration to punish South Africa for backing Russia. The group called for the change of venue of the US-Africa trade summit planned for later this year citing South Africa's "deepening military relationship" with Russia. In a letter to Antony Blinken and other senior officials, the law makers also suggested South Africa is in danger of losing its benefits under the African Growth and Opportunity Act – AGOA.

==== Relations following South Africa v. Israel genocide case ====
On 29 December 2023, South Africa filed a case against Israel, for committing genocide, war crimes, and crimes against humanity against Palestinians in Gaza during the Gaza war, at the International Court of Justice. Proceedings were instituted at the International Court of Justice pursuant to the Genocide Convention, to which both Israel and South Africa are signatory, and brought pursuant to Article IX of the Convention. In the application South Africa alleged that Israel's actions "are genocidal." Additionally, South Africa's president Cyril Ramaphosa also compared Israel's actions to apartheid.

U.S. National Security Council Coordinator for Strategic Communications John Kirby said the U.S. found the "submission meritless, counterproductive, completely without any basis in fact whatsoever." U.S. Secretary of State Antony Blinken called the genocide accusation against Israel "meritless". Some argued that the South African case created additional diplomatic strains and could have "serious diplomatic ramifications." In March 2024, the House of Representatives was considering a bill that calls for a reassessment of the US relationship with South Africa. The bill accuses members of the South African government and leaders of the African National Congress of making anti-Semitic statements after the October 7 attacks, in reference to a statement by South Africa's Department of International Relations and Cooperation after the attack, which said the attack was the result of Israel's "continued illegal occupation of Palestine".

=== Second presidency of Donald Trump ===
Two weeks after the beginning of Donald Trump's second term as US President, his new Secretary of State Marco Rubio announced that he would not attend the 2025 G20 Johannesburg Summit, citing South Africa's controversial land expropriation law as one of his reasons. The following day, Trump issued Executive Order 14204 to suspend any aid or assistance to South Africa.

Foreign Ministry spokesman Chrispin Phiri stated that "the Government of South Africa is incomprehensible and angry about this sanctions decision. Trump's portrayal contradicts the facts and does not recognize the country's painful history of colonialism and apartheid. The decision is apparently the result of a campaign of misinformation and propaganda." President Cyril Ramaphosa had his spokesman say that "the claim that Africans are being arbitrarily dispossessed and are therefore having to flee the country is completely untrue. South Africa is a constitutional democracy." In his annual State of the Nation Address, Ramaphosa spoke about the growing nationalism, protectionism and egoism around the world and, without mentioning Trump by name, added that South Africa will not be intimidated or pushed around.

In February 2025, the Trump administration drastically cut USAID support, affecting HIV programmes across Africa. Experts warned that in South Africa alone, these cuts could lead to 500,000 deaths over the next decade. The U.S. President’s Emergency Plan for AIDS Relief, which has provided $120 billion since 2003 and supported millions of patients, was severely affected. South Africa, with the highest HIV burden globally, saw clinic closures, disrupted treatments, and job losses among healthcare workers. The South African government and UNAIDS pledged to find alternative funding sources, while experts called on the EU and private donors to fill the gap.

In March 2025, after Trump criticized South Africa's new land expropriation law, alleging land seizures without compensation and discrimination against white Afrikaner farmers, South Africa rejected Trump's claims, describing them as misunderstandings, and vowed to maintain a mutually beneficial relationship.

On March 14, 2025, Marco Rubio declared South African Ambassador Ebrahim Rasool persona non grata for his criticism of Trump's 2024 presidential campaign and policies.

On May 12, 2025, the Trump administration brought the first group of white South Africans to the United States through its refugee program. South Africa's foreign ministry called the move "politically motivated." The Episcopal Church of the US responded by terminating their partnership with the federal government, as they were morally opposed to resettling the white Afrikaners.

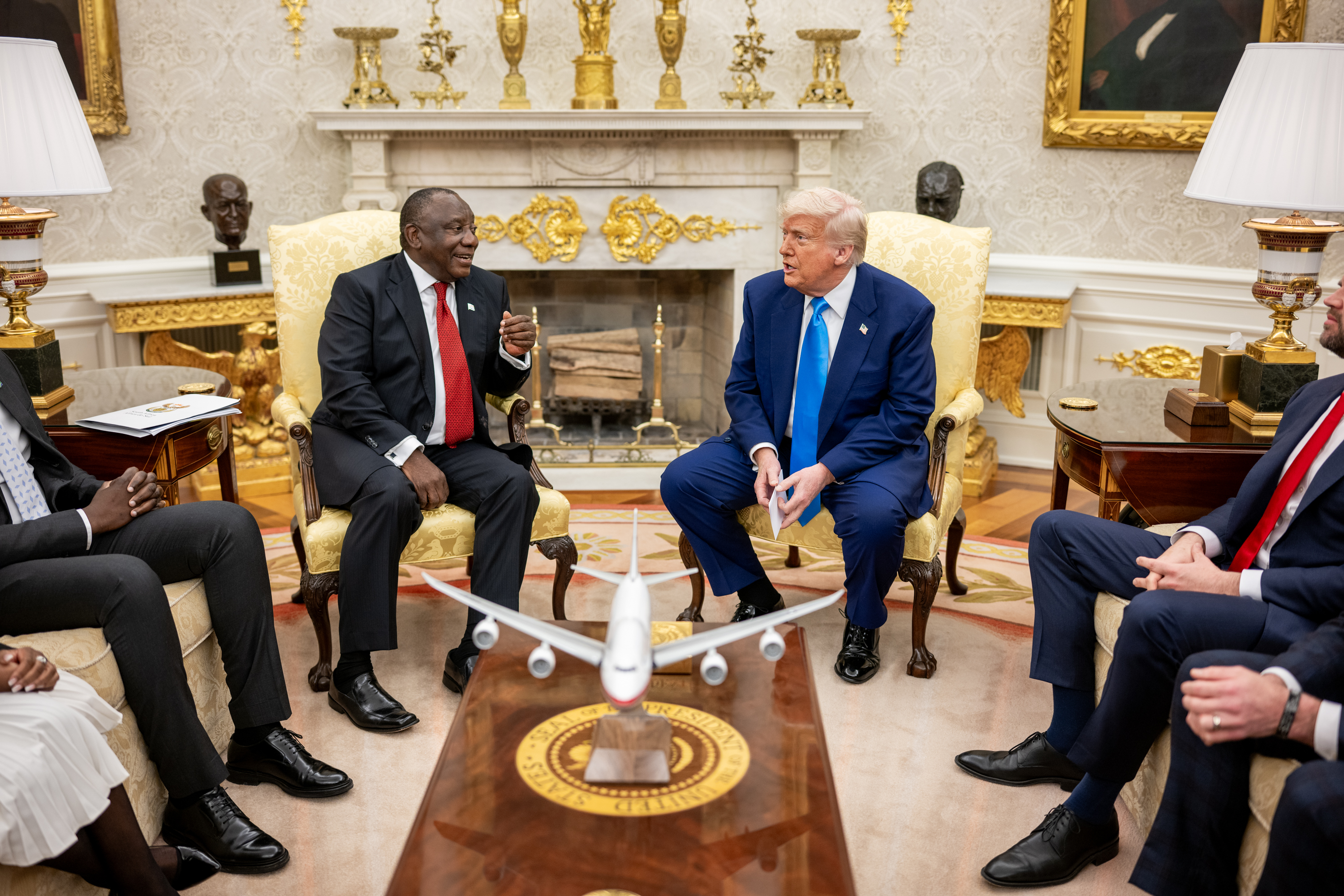
South Africa President Cyril Ramaphosa holds talks with U.S. President Donald Trump at the White House.

On May 21, 2025, Ramaphosa made a state visit to the US to meet with President Donald Trump. During the press conference, Trump confronted Ramaphosa with false claims of white genocide against Afrikaners in South Africa, which Ramaphosa strongly denied. Trump played video footage the opposition South African politician, Juluis Malema, singing the controversial 'Kill the Boer' song on multiple occasions as evidence of the claim.

On 7 July 2025, Trump announced that the US would resume imposing its 30% tariff on South African imports from 1 August 2025. The reason given was that South Africa sells more to the US than it buys. South Africa was one of 14 countries that received notifications of such tariffs from the US.

In response to the announcement, Ramaphosa stated that the tariff was not an accurate representation of available trade data, and was simply based on a specific interpretation of the balance of trade between the two countries. He further said that half of all US goods imported into South Africa were not taxed, and the rest were taxed at just 7.6%. Ramaphosa said SA would continue its diplomatic negotiations with the US.

On 23 July 2025, the United States House Committee on Foreign Affairs, which at the time had a Republican majority, passed the US-South Africa Bilateral Relations Review Act of 2025 (H.R.2633). The a bill, which was introduced into the US Congress in April 2025 by Republican Representative Ronny Jackson, aims to formally review relations with South Africa, and sanction some of the country's politicians. The supposed impetus for the bill is the notion, amongst some US politicians, that South Africa has, and continues to, align with anti-American interests, specifically in relation to SA's diplomatic and trade to particular countries around the world, like China, Russia, Iran, and Palestine.

The Bilateral Relations Review Act passed with 34 members in favor and 16 against, meaning a significant number of Republicans and Democrats voted in favor. Opponents of the bill stated that differences between South Africa and the United States should be resolved through diplomatic channels, not punitive legislation. A similar bill brought forward previously by the same Representative failed to pass in the US Senate, lacking broad support from its members. Such bills need to pass in the US House and Senate, before they can be signed into law by the US President.

In September 2025, Donald Trump confirmed that he would not be attending the 20th G20 summit, scheduled to take place in South Africa in November the same year. Trump said that US Vice President JD Vance would attend instead. White House later announced that no American officials would attend citing widely discredited allegations of persecution of white people there. None of South Africa's political parties, including those representing Afrikaners and the white community, claim that genocide occurred in South Africa. President Ramaphosa stated that the summit would nonetheless be a success.

Starting in February 2025, South Africa had laid off approximately 8,000 health care workers due to the USAID freeze and re-start difficulties. However, in October, the Trump administration and the South African government agreed to a transitional period running from October 1, 2025, until March 31, 2026, with $115 million in health aid flowing from the United States to South Africa. South African Minister in the Presidency Khumbudzo Ntshavheni said, “It’s a confirmation of the good bilateral relations between South Africa and the U.S. so that when we have complaints, they intervene and we find an amicable solution to the problem.”

In January 2026, the official government of South Africa was critical of U.S. actions against Venezuela during Operation Southern Spear. The Department of International Relations and Cooperation (DIRCO) views these military actions as a manifest violation of the Charter of the United Nations and South Africa called the UN Security Council to convene urgently. Both Venezuela and South Africa sought political alignment through BRICS and joint mining enterprises.

In June 2026 a former South African Air Force general working at the Oak Ridge National Laboratory was sentenced for conducting espionage activities in the United States, further complicating South African-American relations.

== Economic relations ==
=== Trade and investment ===
Bilateral trade between South Africa and the U.S. increased in 2021 to $24.5 billion, with a trade imbalance of $9.3 billion in South Africa's favour. Industrial supplies and materials were the largest component of trade flows in both directions. South Africa is also a net beneficiary of investment links between the countries. The stock of South African investment in the U.S. has more than doubled since 2011, amounting to $3.5 billion in 2020, while U.S. direct investment in South Africa increased about 70% over that period, to $10 billion in 2020. This made the U.S. South Africa's fifth largest source of foreign direct investment in 2019, while the U.S. was its third largest destination for outward foreign direct investment. In the same year, U.S. investment in South Africa was concentrated in manufacturing, finance and insurance, and wholesale trade; and American multinationals operating in South Africa employed an estimated 134,600 people.

=== Formal agreements ===
South Africa and the U.S. signed a formal bilateral Trade and Investment Framework Agreement in 1999, amended in 2012. They are also bound by the Trade, Investment, and Development Cooperative Agreement signed in 2008 between the U.S. and the Southern African Customs Union (of which South Africa is a member), though this was only a limited substitute for the more extensive reciprocal SACU–U.S. trade agreement envisaged in earlier years before negotiations stalled. The U.S. has direct trade and investment promotion agreements with two individual South African provincial governments, in the Western Cape and Gauteng, signed in 2021 and 2022 respectively. Other preferential trade benefits accrue to South Africa under the U.S. Generalized System of Preferences programme, although in 2020 the U.S. reclassified it as a developed country (rather than a developing country) for the purposes of U.S. trade remedies legislation and countervailing duty investigations.

Thriving economic links between the countries are also attributed in large part to the African Growth and Opportunity Act (AGOA), under which South Africa is eligible for preferential benefits and additionally for special textiles and apparel benefits. The Trade Law Centre for Southern Africa estimates that South Africa has been the biggest beneficiary of AGOA in terms of non-oil trade. But AGOA has also led to bilateral trade disputes. In 2015, the U.S. attempted to use the threat of South Africa's exclusion from AGOA to lobby against the passage of the Private Security Industry Regulation Amendment Bill, which would have required 51% South African owner in all security companies operating in the country, to the detriment of American firms. Following the May 21 meeting at the white house between US President Donald Trump and South African president Cyril Ramaphosa it has been reported that South Africa will import 1 billion dollars' worth of American liquified natural gas annually.

=== Chicken wars ===
AGOA was also invoked as a negotiating instrument during the so-called "chicken wars" of the early 2010s, after South Africa imposed anti-dumping measures on certain U.S. chicken imports. U.S. politicians, especially those hailing from the segment of the U.S. Congress known as the "Chicken Caucus", lobbied for South Africa's exclusion from AGOA as a retaliatory measure. South Africa was included in the extended AGOA from 2015, but in November U.S. President Barack Obama provided 60-day notice of his intent to suspend AGOA agricultural benefits to South Africa unless the poultry barriers were removed. The countries reached a deal in early 2016 which opened the South African market to American chicken.

== Diplomatic visits ==
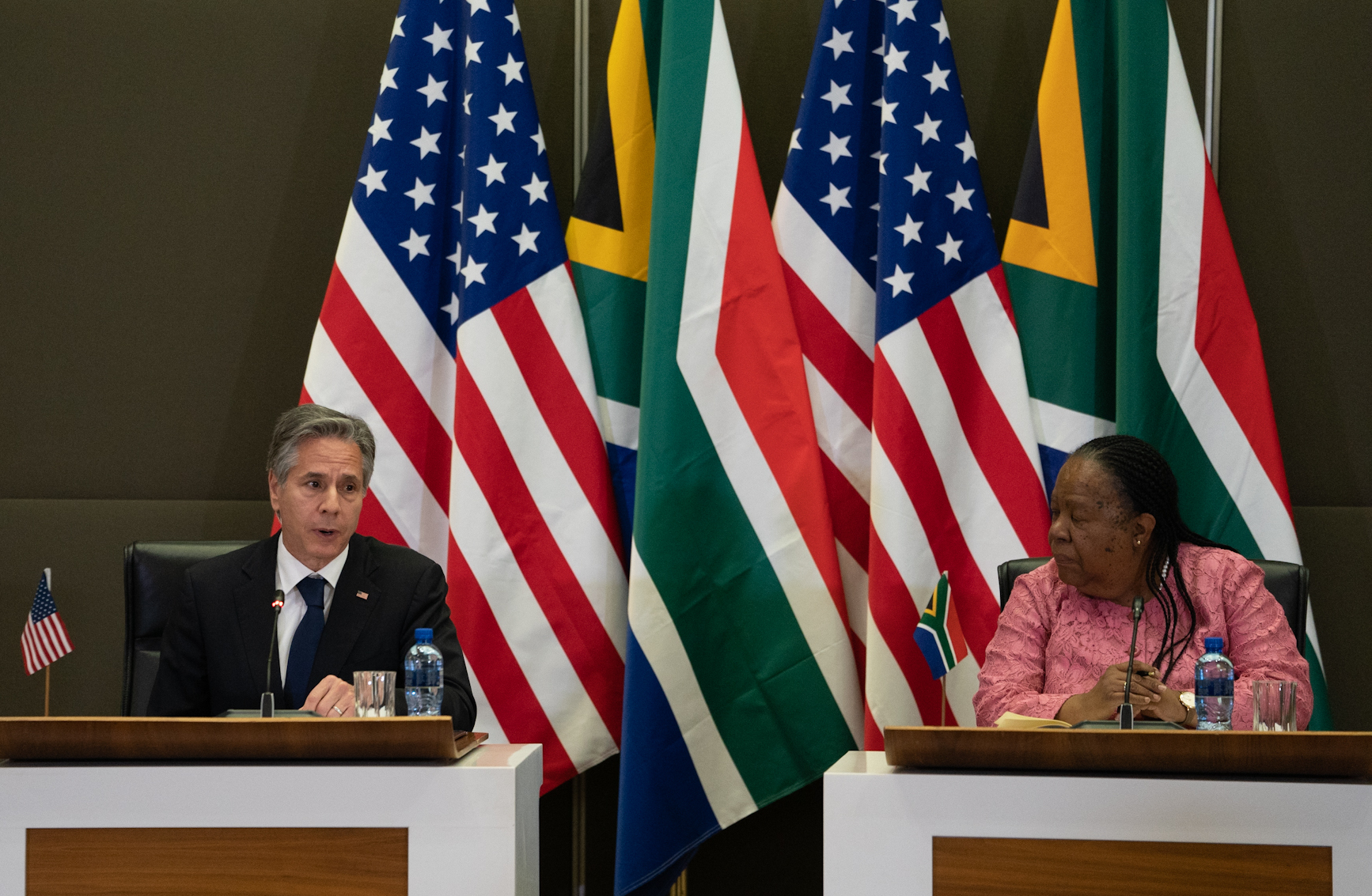
US Secretary of State Antony Blinken speaks with the then South African Foreign Minister Naledi Pandor in 2022

Under the National Party apartheid government, South African and American heads of state did not exchange visits, with the exception of two visits by F.W. De Klerk. However, three American Secretaries of State visited South Africa during that period: Henry Kissinger (1976) and Cyrus Vance (April and October 1978), both to discuss Rhodesia and Namibia; and James Baker (1990), to meet with De Klerk and ANC leaders.

Diplomatic visits between the two nations increased near the end of apartheid. In February 1990, U.S. President George H. W. Bush invited both sitting South African President F.W. de Klerk and ANC leader Nelson Mandela to visit the White House. Both men accepted the invitation, with de Klerk scheduled to visit 18 June 1990 and Mandela, recently released from prison, scheduled to visit a week later. After controversy arose in South Africa, de Klerk postponed his visit. Mandela visited Washington on 24 June 1990 and met with President Bush and other officials. He also addressed a joint session of Congress. In September, de Klerk visited Washington, the first official state visit by a South African leader.

Mandela was subsequently elected President of South Africa, and U.S. Vice President Al Gore and First Lady Hillary Clinton attended his inauguration in Pretoria in May 1994. In October of that year, Mandela returned to Washington for a state dinner hosted by U.S. President Bill Clinton.

President Clinton visited South Africa in March 1998, marking the first time a sitting U.S. president visited the country. Since Clinton's visit, two of his successors have visited the country: President George W. Bush visited in July 2003, and President Barack Obama visited the country twice, in June 2013 (for a state visit) and in December of the same year (for the funeral of Mandela), with the latter being joined by 3 former presidents: Bush, Clinton and Jimmy Carter.

As Vice President (2009 to 2017), Joe Biden travelled to the country in June 2010, to attend the opening ceremony of the 2010 FIFA World Cup.

=== List of visits ===
The following is a list of visits by South African heads of state to the United States and by American heads of state to South Africa.

Visits by South African and U.S. heads of state, 1945–2025
Head of state	Country	Year	Dates	Description
Prime Minister Jan Smuts	South Africa	1945	April 25–June 26	Led the South African delegation to the UN Conference in San Francisco.
Prime Minister Jan Smuts	South Africa	1946	December 1–2	Led the South African delegation to the UN General Assembly.
President F.W. de Klerk	South Africa	1990	September 23–25	Official working visit.
President F.W. de Klerk	South Africa	1993	June 30–July 5	Met with President Bill Clinton during a private visit, and received the Liberty Medal in Philadelphia.
President Nelson Mandela	South Africa	1994	October 4–7	State visit. Addressed a joint meeting of Congress, and also addressed the UN General Assembly.
President Bill Clinton	United States	1998	March 25–29	Met with President Nelson Mandela and addressed a joint session of Parliament.
President Nelson Mandela	South Africa	1998	September 21–23	Working visit.
President Thabo Mbeki	South Africa	1999	September 21	Met with President Bill Clinton during a meeting of the UN General Assembly.
President Thabo Mbeki	South Africa	2000	May 22–25	State visit. Afterwards visited Austin, Texas.
President Thabo Mbeki	South Africa	2001	June 25–27	Working visit.
President Thabo Mbeki	South Africa	2001	November 11	Met with President George W. Bush during a meeting of the UN General Assembly.
President Thabo Mbeki	South Africa	2002	September 13	Met with President George W. Bush during a meeting of the UN General Assembly.
President George W. Bush	United States	2003	July 8–10	Met with President Thabo Mbeki.
President Thabo Mbeki	South Africa	2004	June 10–11	Met with President George W. Bush at the G8 Economic Summit and attended the funeral of former President Ronald Reagan.
President Thabo Mbeki	South Africa	2005	June 1	Working visit.
President Thabo Mbeki	South Africa	2006	December 7–8	Working visit.
President Kgalema Motlanthe	South Africa	2008	November 14–15	Attended the G20 Economic Summit.
President Jacob Zuma	South Africa	2009	September 24–25	Attended the G20 Economic Summit.
President Jacob Zuma	South Africa	2010	April 12–13	Attended the Nuclear Security Summit.
President Barack Obama	United States	2013	June 28–July 1	Met with President Jacob Zuma. Also met with members of the Mandela family and visited Robben Island.
President Barack Obama	United States	2013	December 5–6	Attended the funeral of former President Nelson Mandela.
President Jacob Zuma	South Africa	2014	August 5–6	Attended the U.S.–Africa Leaders Summit.
President Cyril Ramaphosa	South Africa	2022	September 17	Met with President Joe Biden at the White House.
President Cyril Ramaphosa	South Africa	2025	May 21	Met with President Donald Trump at the White House.

== Public opinion ==
According to a 2026 Pew Research Center survey, 35% of South Africans had a favorable view of the United States, while 55% had a negative view.

== Resident diplomatic missions ==
of South Africa in the United States

- Washington, D.C. (Embassy)
- Los Angeles (Consulate-General)
- New York City (Consulate-General)

of the United States in South Africa

- Pretoria (Embassy)
- Cape Town (Consulate-General)
- Durban (Consulate-General)
- Johannesburg (Consulate-General)

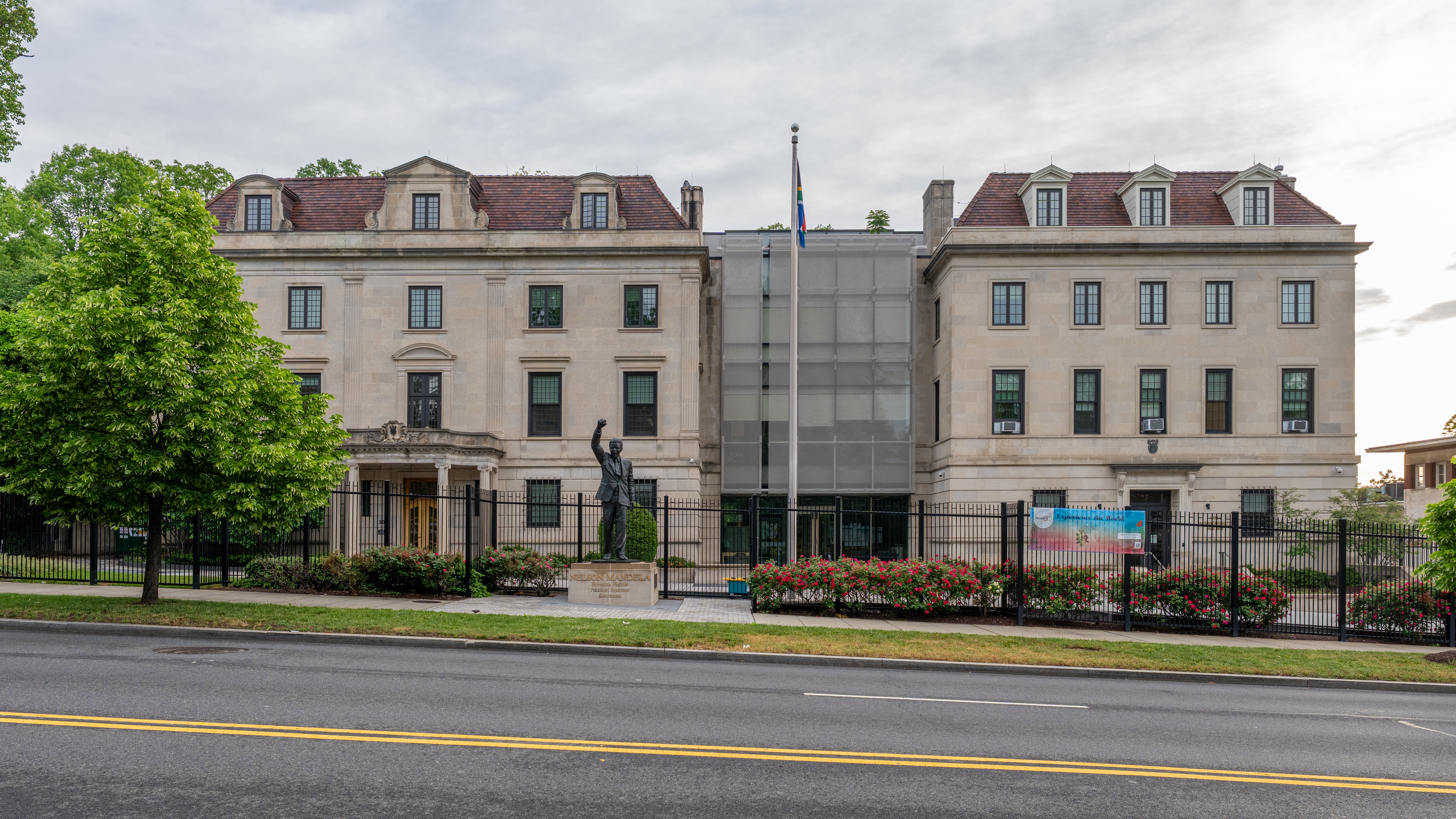
Embassy of South Africa in Washington, D.C.
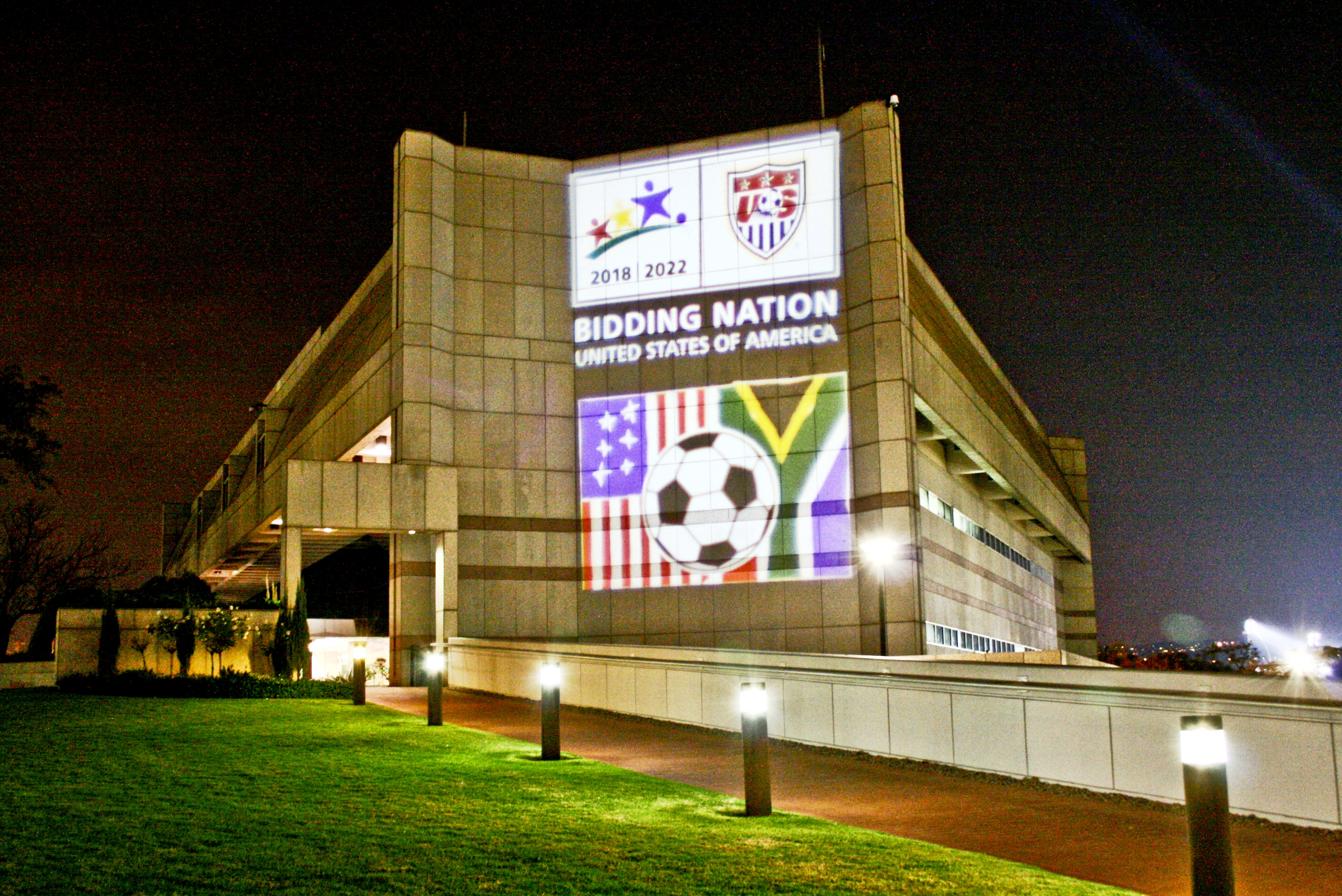
Embassy of the United States in Pretoria

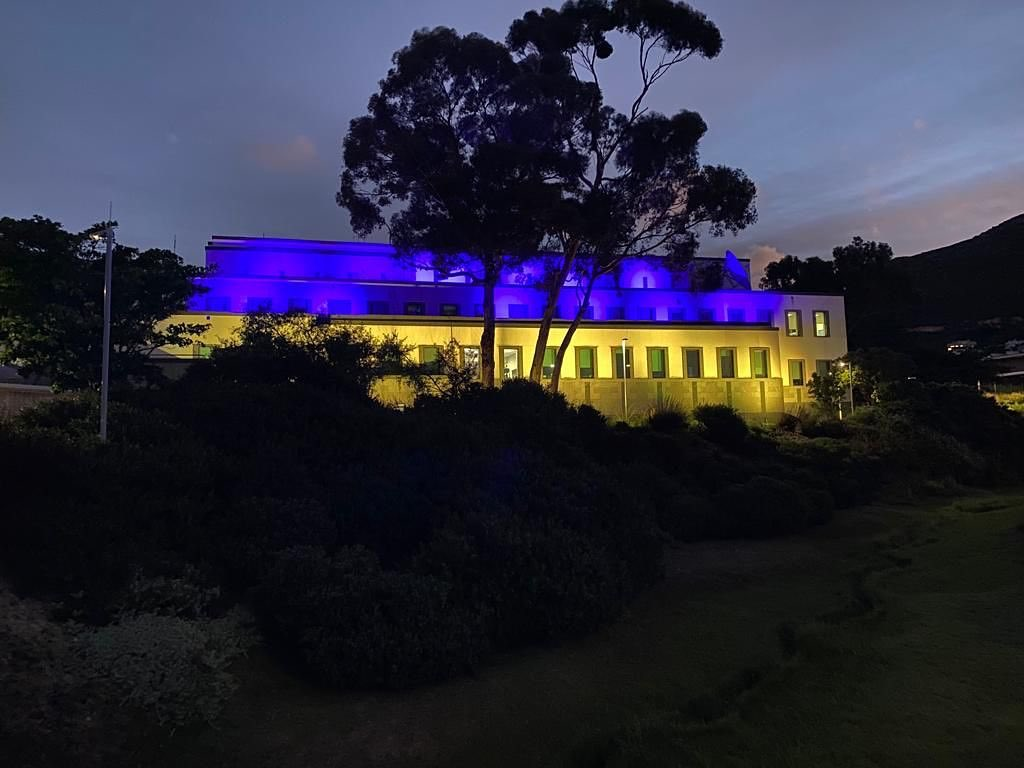
Consulate-General of the United States in Cape Town

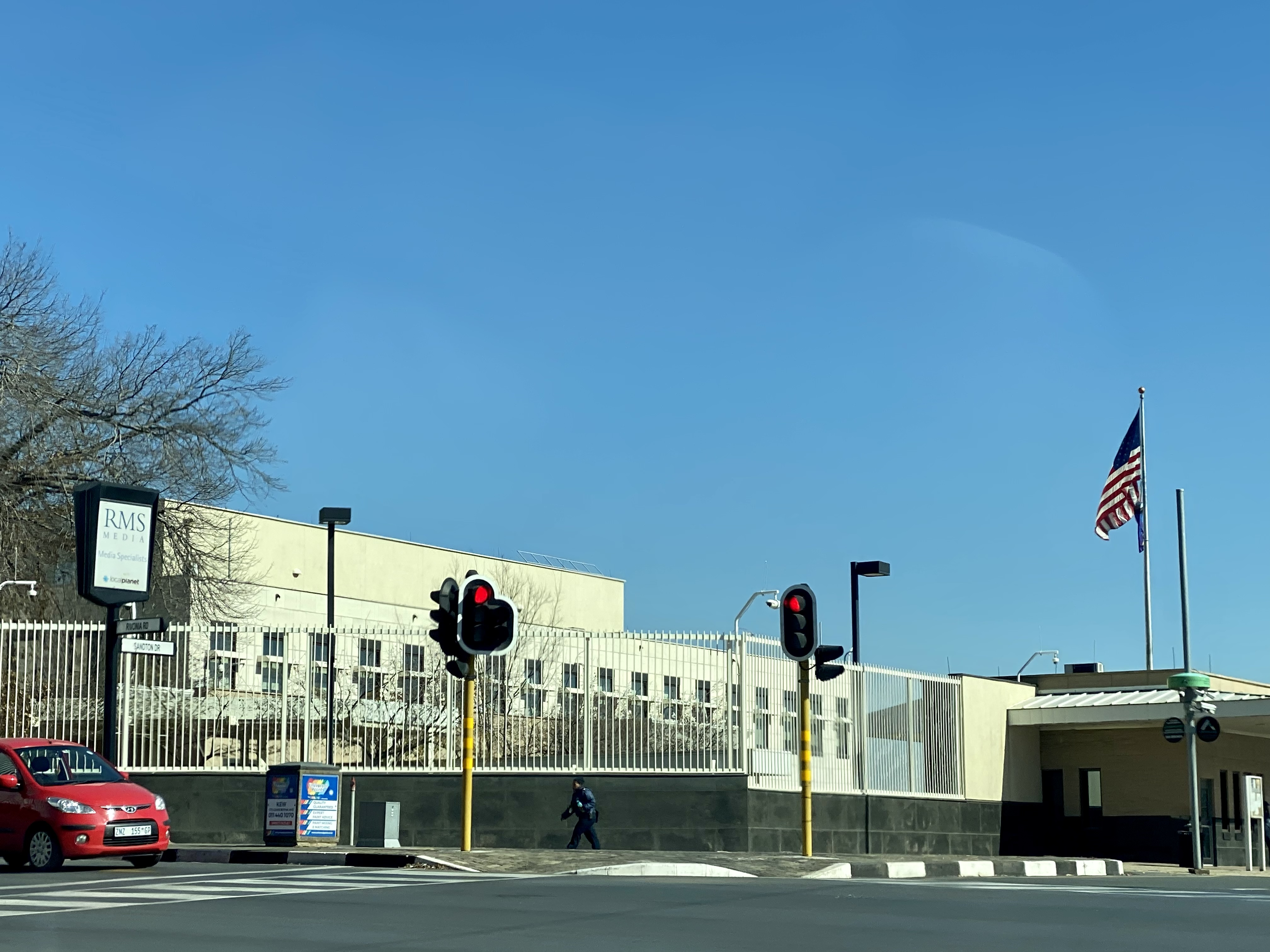
Consulate-General of the United States in Johannesburg

== See also ==
- South African Americans
- Foreign relations of South Africa
- Foreign relations of the United States
- Constructive engagement
- Comprehensive Anti-Apartheid Act of 1986
- Free South Africa Movement
