= Venning Park =

South African park

Coordinates: 25°44′47″S 28°13′16″E

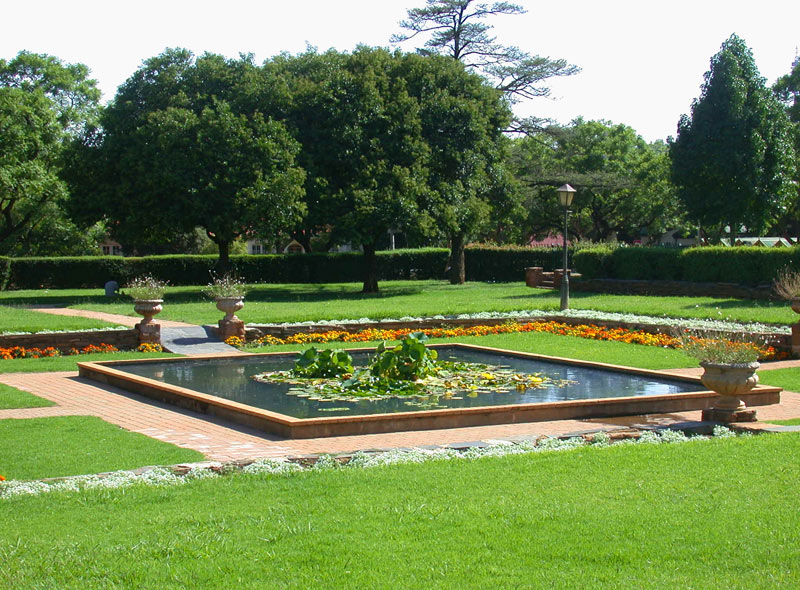
A sunken garden in the park

Venning Park is a park in Arcadia, Pretoria, South Africa. The three-hectare park is formally laid out with a sunken garden on the western side of the park and a tea garden, the Heavenly Rose Café, in the middle. The park also features a date palm-lined path and rose gardens on the eastern side near the American Embassy and the Indian High Commission. Annuals are regularly planted on a site between the busy arteries of Pretorius and Schoeman Streets and quieter Eastwood and Farenden Streets.

== History ==
The park is named after John Harold Venning, former Municipal Parks Director of the city, who retired in 1940.

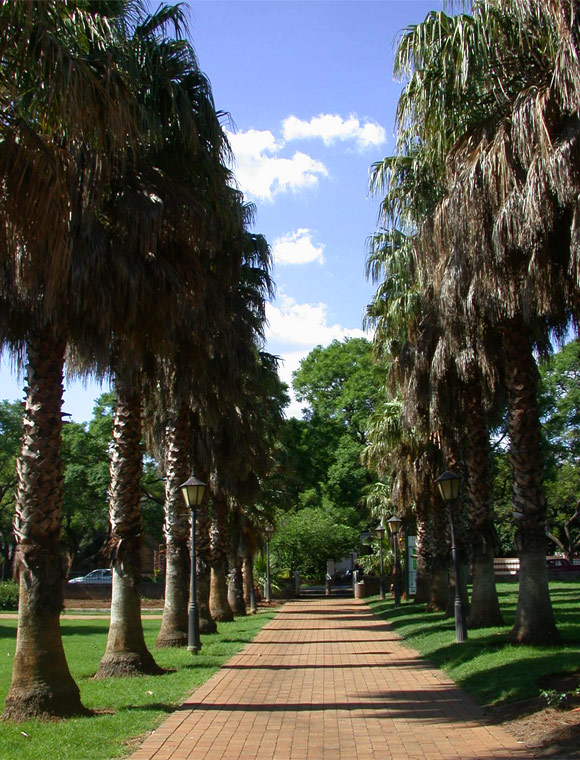
Date palm lane

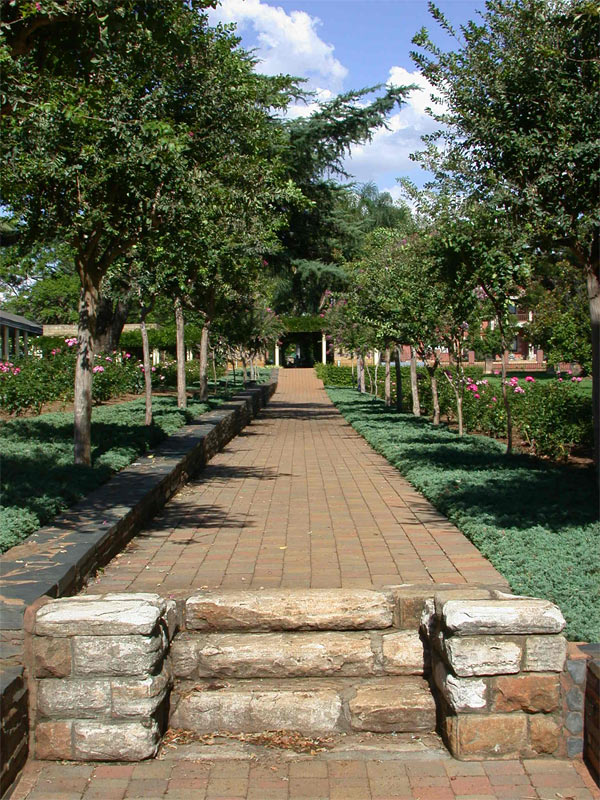
Pride of India Lane

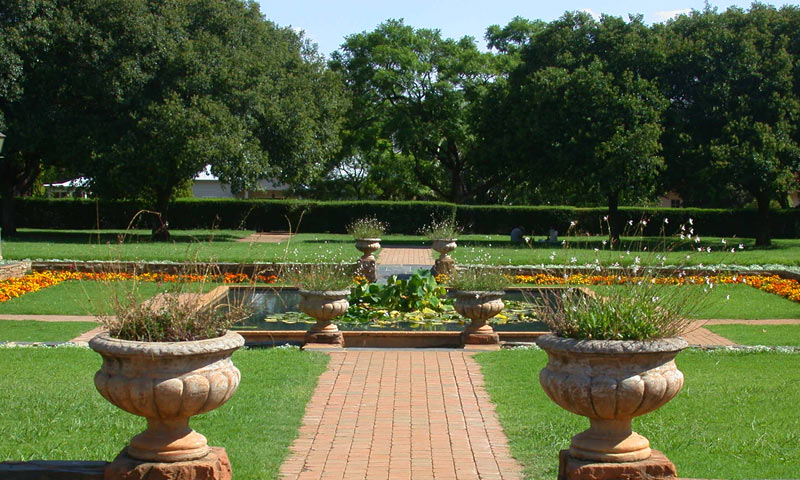
Sunken garden - westward view

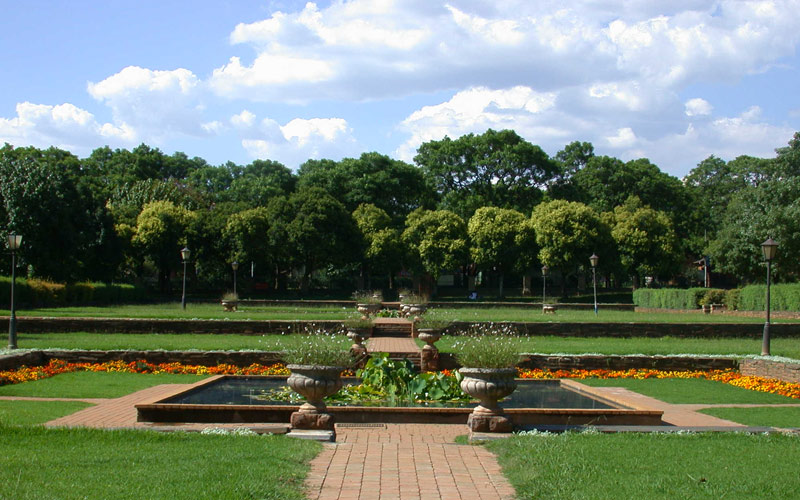
Sunken garden - eastward view
