= 2025 Trump–Ramaphosa Oval Office meeting =

Meeting between the presidents of South Africa and the U.S.

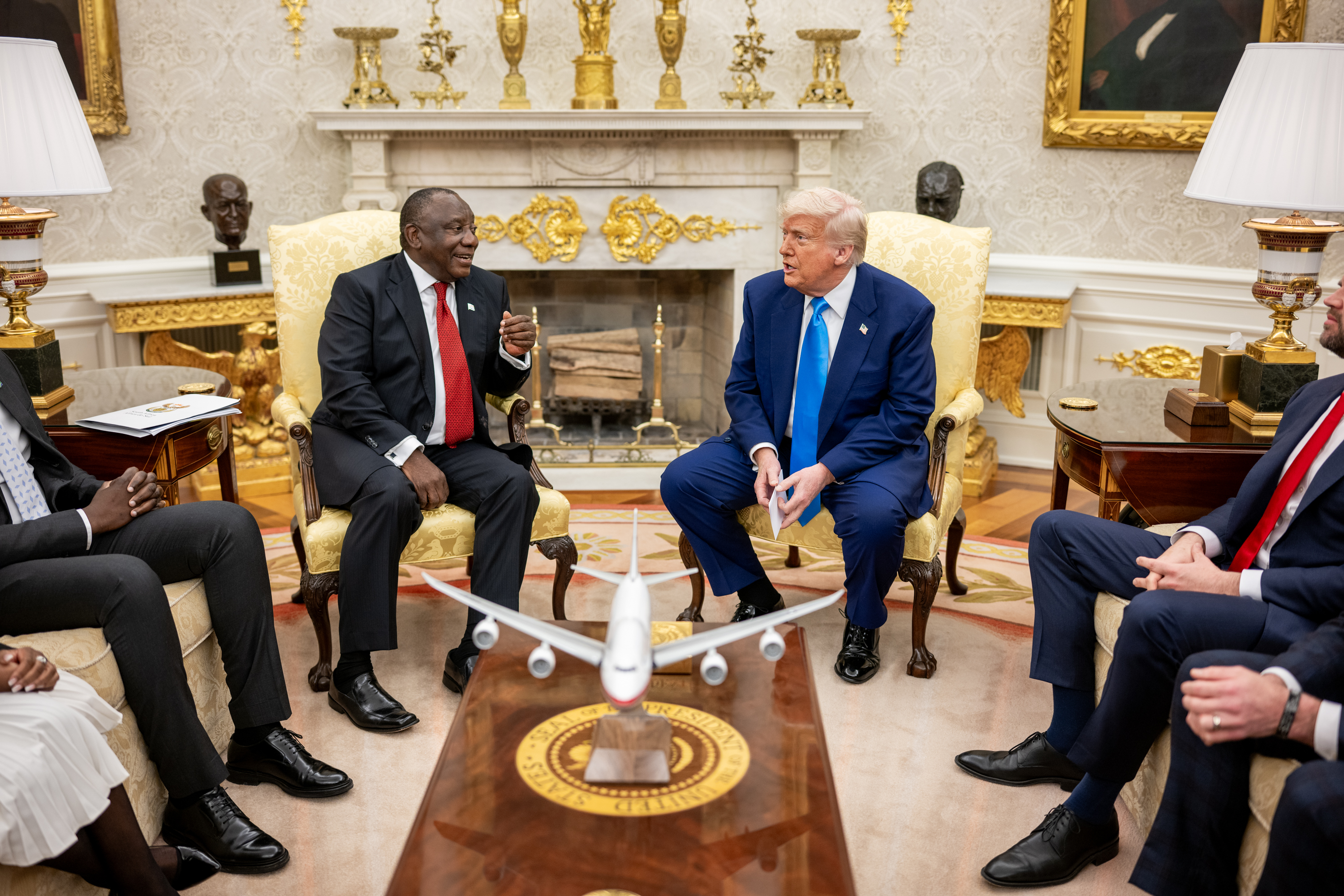
- Cyril Ramaphosa and Donald Trump engaging in discussion in the Oval Office at the White House
- Date: May 21, 2025
- Venue: Oval Office, White House
- Location: Washington, D.C., United States
- Participants: United States: Donald Trump, President of the United States; JD Vance, Vice President of the United States; Pete Hegseth, United States Secretary of Defense; Howard Lutnick, United States Secretary of Commerce; Susie Wiles, White House Chief of Staff; Elon Musk; South Africa: Cyril Ramaphosa, President of South Africa; Ronald Lamola, Minister of International Relations and Cooperation; Khumbudzo Ntshavheni, Minister in the Presidency; Parks Tau, Minister of Trade, Industry and Competition; John Steenhuisen, Minister of Agriculture; Ernie Els, Professional Golfer; Retief Goosen, Professional Golfer; Johann Rupert, South African Billionaire

On May 21, 2025, Donald Trump, the president of the United States and Cyril Ramaphosa, the president of South Africa, held a contentious bilateral meeting broadcast live in the Oval Office at the White House in Washington, D.C.

Among the topics addressed were the controversial issues of land reform and farm attacks in South Africa, the latter of which Trump claimed were mainly racially motivated and disproportionately affected white farmers. Trump also confronted Ramaphosa with claims of "white genocide" against Afrikaners and English-speaking South Africans, which Ramaphosa, together with other members of the South African delegation, strongly denied.

== Background ==
The meeting took place against the backdrop of deteriorating diplomatic relations between South Africa and the United States. After Trump took office in 2025, he signed an executive order suspending foreign aid to South Africa and launched a white South African refugee program, following a controversial land law signed by Ramaphosa permitting the government to seize farmland from ethnic minorities – namely white Afrikaners, who own most of the country's farmland. The Trump administration repeatedly and accused the South African government of being involved in a "white genocide" targeting, a narrative that has been rejected by South African government and court officials. In March, Secretary of State Marco Rubio declared South Africa's ambassador to the United States, Ebrahim Rasool, a persona non grata after Rasool accused the Trump administration of promoting white supremacy. Trump also imposed a 31% tariff rate on South African goods, as part of a series of wider international tariffs.

Ramaphosa intended to use the meeting to reset bilateral relations and negotiate a comprehensive trade deal to better address South Africa's economic and diplomatic challenges. Arriving at the meeting, he brought a diverse group of figures, including prominent business leaders and sports figures, to strengthen his case while simultaneously providing himself a shield against a potential confrontation similar to what President Volodymyr Zelenskyy of Ukraine had encountered two months before in the Oval Office.

== Meeting ==
The full meeting (Trump shows the video montage at 21:07.)

The meeting began amiably with Trump and Ramaphosa discussing golf. Trump praised South Africa's golf players, while Ramaphosa brought Trump a 14 kg golf book about the country's golf courses.

Roughly twenty minutes into the meeting, after Ramaphosa told Trump to "listen to the voices of South Africans" to realize that there was no alleged genocide of Afrikaners, Trump signalled for his staff to dim the Oval Office lights so that a video compilation could be screened.

The montage consisted of utterances made by South African opposition politician Julius Malema, and it included a speech by Malema at the South African parliament, then a 2018 speech by Malema, which was followed by two clips of Malema singing of the controversial song Kill the Boer, a 2018 speech mentioning the then-mayor of Port Elizabeth Athol Trollip, a white man from the Democratic Alliance, and two more clips of Malema singing Kill the Boer, the last one occurring at the FNB Stadium in Johannesburg. The video continued with a segment of an interview Malema gave to TRT World, then a clip of former South African President Jacob Zuma singing Kill the Boer. The video concluded with another speech by Malema, then a video which Trump claimed were burial sites of white farmers. The video was described by certain media outlets as an attempt to "ambush" Ramaphosa.

Trump later showed Ramaphosa a stack of news clippings which he claimed described farm murders in South Africa. Ramaphosa asserted that the speeches were not government policy, that South Africa is a democratic multi-party nation. He also asserted that his government policy was completely against what Malena and Zuma were saying in the video, and that they were a small minority party, which is allowed to exist according to the constitution.

After being asked about the Qatari jet that was given to the Pentagon, Trump scolded NBC reporter Peter Alexander for asking an unrelated question and criticized NBC. He also stated: "Brian Roberts and the people that run that place, they are to be investigated." Ramaphosa interjected with an apology for not having a plane to gift Trump, to which Trump replied, "I wish you did." During the meeting, Johann Rupert, a South African businessman who accompanied Ramaphosa, pleaded: "We need technological help. We need Starlink at every little police station, and we need drones".

The following day, a screenshot Trump displayed during the meeting which he claimed had shown burials of white South African farmers was revealed to have been taken from a Reuters video shot in the Democratic Republic of Congo and published on February 3, 2025, following a rebel offensive in Goma.

== Reactions ==
Ramaphosa was commended by much of the South African press and public for his composure and courtesy under what was widely described as an "ambush". However, some commentators and opposition figures criticized him for not responding more forcefully to Trump's provocations and for bringing prominent white business and sports figures, which some felt inadvertently reinforced Trump's narrative. Some in South Africa expressed disappointment at the lack of a stronger rebuttal to Trump's claims while others praised Ramaphosa's restraint and diplomatic approach. Ramaphosa's office deemed the visit overall as "successful", while the two countries remained in trade discussions, with Ramaphosa emphasizing a reset on bilateral relations.

Following the meeting, Prime Minister of Canada Mark Carney's office released a statement saying that Carney and Ramaphosa "discussed the strong and growing partnership between Canada and South Africa, with increased co-operation in wildfire management, technology, and trade and investment."

== See also ==
External videos
- The video shown by Trump to Ramaphosa at the meeting, available on YouTube

- Foreign policy of the second Donald Trump administration
- South Africa–United States relations
- South African farm attacks
