= Dubul' ibhunu =

South African anti-apartheid song

"Dubul' ibhunu" (Xhosa: [dəbʊliːbuːnuː]), translated as shoot the Boer, kill the Boer or kill the farmer, is a controversial South African anti-apartheid song. It is sung in Xhosa or Zulu. The song originates in the struggle against apartheid, when it was first sung to protest against the Afrikaner-dominated National Party-led government of South Africa that existed from 1948 to 1994. It gained new prominence after 2010 following its use at political rallies held by the African National Congress (ANC) and Economic Freedom Fighters (EFF).

South African courts ruled it to be a form of hate speech in 2010, a ruling that was later overturned in 2022 in a specific protest incident in 2020 following the murder of a farm manager in Senekal. Supporters of the song see it as a song that articulates an important part of South Africa's history, is an important part of political discourse, and that its meaning has been misconstrued as advocating killing Boers or farmers. Opponents of the song argue that it can be seen to bear a literal interpretation and therefore constitutes an incitement to violence and hate speech. Social and political commentators on South Africa, such as Jonathan Jansen and Stephen Grootes, have noted the song's ability to increase racial divisions within South Africa and polarisation, whilst strengthening radicals on either side of the country's political spectrum.

== Interpretation ==
Boers, a sub-group of Afrikaners, are the descendants of the Dutch-speaking Free Burghers of the eastern Cape frontier in southern Africa who migrated to the rest of what would become South Africa during the Great Trek. The word boer also means 'farmer' in the Afrikaans language and, depending on the context, is often a pejorative term for an Afrikaner when used by non-Afrikaners.

Depending on the interpretation, the song might alternatively refer to institutional structures such as the National Party (NP), or to specific groups of people such as Afrikaner members of the South African Police (colloquially known as Boers), the armed forces in South Africa during apartheid, white farmers, or to a specific ethnic group (Afrikaners) or racial group (White South Africans) generally.

Then African National Congress (ANC) secretary-general Gwede Mantashe has stated that interpreting dubul' ibhunu as 'kill the boer, kill the farmer' are perceiving a "vulgarised" version of the song that "incit[es] conflict" and that the song should instead be interpreted in the context of the struggle against apartheid as referring to a system. American ambassador to South Africa, Ambassador Leo Brent Bozell III, has stated that the US government considers the song to be a form of hate speech and that the lack of an official government condemnation of it is a significant impediment to good South Africa–United States relations.

== History ==
The song has origins across the South African anti-apartheid political spectrum and was used by both the ANC and Pan Africanist Congress (PAC). It pre-dates the toyi-toyi protest dance.

One of the first recorded accounts of "Dubul' ibhunu" was during the Delmas Treason Trial in 1985. The song was brought up in testimony during the trial, wherein the prosecutor tried to link the defendants to the song and thereby prove malicious intent. The defense was able to rebut the implication that the accused acted with mens rea when it was proven that they were not present during its singing.

During the Truth and Reconciliation Commission hearings, Ntuthuko Chuene claimed that he killed Godfrey Frederick Lanz Heuer on his farm in August 1992 because he had been influenced by the "kill the Boer, kill the farmer" chant at ANC rallies. Chuene was convicted for Heuer's murder and sought clemency for what he argued was a politically motivated killing. Heuer's wife refused to give her permission to grant Chuene amnesty, arguing that Chuene's act was criminal in motivation rather than political.

Anti-apartheid activist and politician Peter Mokaba sang the song at a 1993 memorial rally for the recently assassinated anti-apartheid leader Chris Hani. The period in the run-up to South Africa's first democratic election in 1994 and subsequent transfer of power from white-minority government was a notable period of instability for South Africa, marked with fears of potential for widespread racial violence. It was feared that the assassination of Chris Hani might trigger such violence and political chaos. This coincided with Operation Great Storm, a violent paramilitary campaign launched by the Azanian People's Liberation Army (APLA), the armed wing of the PAC, aimed at violently displacing white farmers to reclaim land for black Africans.

At Mokaba's funeral in 2002, the crowd spontaneously sang the song while ANC leaders were present.

On 21 May 2025, during a press conference in the Oval Office, U.S. President Donald Trump played a video featuring Julius Malema, leader of the Economic Freedom Fighters, chanting "Kill the Boer, kill the farmer" and "Shoot the farmer – brrrrr pow!" at a political rally. Trump, seated next to South African President Cyril Ramaphosa, presented the footage as evidence to support claims of a "white genocide" occurring in South Africa. President Ramaphosa refuted the allegations, stating that such chants did not reflect official government policy and that violence in South Africa affects all communities. He reaffirmed his government's commitment to public safety and nonracialism. Four days later Malema again sang the song at an EFF rally.

== Controversy ==
The song is controversial in post-apartheid South Africa, where it has experienced a revival, being most notably sung by then African National Congress Youth League (ANCYL) leader, later leader of the EFF, Julius Malema and then South African President Jacob Zuma. The song, along with the slogan "One settler, one bullet", is often associated with the phenomenon of farm attacks in South Africa. The public reaction to the song has been compared to the public reaction to the anti-Indian Zulu language song AmaNdiya.

Malema first sang the song during a speech he was giving, in his capacity as President of the ANCLY, at the University of Johannesburg in 2010, where he sang in the context of post-1994 South Africa's slow resolution to the problem of unequal distribution of land ownership along racial lines. Four weeks after Malema's 2010 singing of the song, Eugène Terre'Blanche, a farmer, white supremacist, convicted criminal and founder of the Afrikaner nationalist and neo-Nazi paramilitary group, Afrikaner Weerstandsbeweging, was murdered on his farm by a black employee. Following these events, the Afrikaner civil rights organisation, AfriForum, opened a case against Malema, alleging that his use of the song was a provocation to racial violence and hate speech.

At the EFF's 10th anniversary rally in 2023, Malema (now as leader of the Economic Freedom Fighters) again sang the song to an estimated 90,000 supporters at the FNB Stadium. The incident received international coverage with Elon Musk criticizing Malema on Twitter for singing the song, accusing him of "openly pushing for the genocide of white people in South Africa". Malema subsequently replied on Twitter stating "O bolela masepa" ("You are talking shit").

South Africa's then official opposition political party, the Democratic Alliance, stated it would file a complaint with the United Nations Human Rights Council whilst the Freedom Front Plus, a right-wing Afrikaner nationalist party, opened a case of intimidation. Malema later denied the accusation, citing Judge Molahlehi's 2022 judgement that the song was to be interpreted within its political context and thus not to be taken literally. Malema also stated that he and the EFF would continue to sing the song.

In March 2025, Elon Musk posted a video to X of Julius Malema singing "Dubul' ibhunu" with a caption expressing his outrage at "a major political party ... that is actively promoting white genocide". US President Donald Trump then reposted Musk's comment on his own Truth Social along with his own condemnation of the song and a request that the South African government "protect Afrikaner and other disfavored minorities" as well as inviting Afrikaners to immigrate to the United States. For a time on 14 May 2025, X's chatbot Grok suddenly began mentioning "Kill the Boer" and white genocide in response to entirely unrelated topics, confusing users. The issue was fixed later that same day.

=== Legal decisions ===
The song has been the subject of multiple court cases seeking to determine if the song is a form of hate speech, which is not protected speech by the South African Constitution and so is an offence to utter, or if it is a form of free speech that is protected by the constitution.

==== 2003 Human Rights Commission ruling ====
Following a complaint from the Freedom Front Plus, the South African Human Rights Commission (SAHRC) ruled that the song amounted to hate speech in the context of a post-apartheid South Africa that was seeking reconciliation.

==== 2010 Johannesburg high court decision ====
In March 2010, Johannesburg high court acting Judge Leon Halgryn "accepted that these Zulu words mean “shoot the boer/white man” and constitute hate speech, and that uttering or publishing them could be a criminal offence if the intention is to encourage crime."

==== 2010 North Gauteng High Court decision ====
In April 2010 the North Gauteng High Court interdicted and restrained Julius Malema from publicly uttering the words of the song pending a decision by the Equality Court where a complaint regarding the song had already been laid.

==== 2011 Equality Court decision ====
In September 2011, the Equality Court at the South Gauteng High Court ruled that the song was discriminatory, harmful, undermined the dignity of Afrikaners, and thereby constituted hate speech; and that it "prima facie satisfies the crime of incitement to murder". The court ruled that Julius Malema, who was brought before the court for previously singing the song at rallies, was forbidden from singing it in the future. Following the ruling Malema changed the wording of the song to "Kiss the Boer" and sang that instead—however, it can be argued to still have the same psychological influence as the original, due to the well-known context for the altered lyrics. The following year, the ANC stated that they would not sing the song anymore.

==== 2019 Human Rights Commission ruling ====
The SAHRC acquitted Malema on five accounts of hate speech towards White and Indian South Africans, one of the charges being for the singing of an altered "Kiss the boer" version of "Dubul' ibhunu". The SAHRC found that although Malema's comments were "still quite problematic to us in a democratic society that is committed to healing the divisions" the charges brought against him were an attempt at suppressing "legitimate criticism and debate". In July 2023 the Johannesburg High Court set aside the 2019 SAHRC finding, ruling that the SAHRC had acted outside its mandate in its finding on hateful speech.

==== 2022 Johannesburg High Court decision ====
Malema, now leader of the EFF, again appeared in court in 2022 for allegedly singing the song in a case brought by Afriforum, where the issue of whether or not the song was hate speech was debated. The Johannesburg High Court ruled that the song did not constitute hate speech and was not intended to be taken literally. The court found that Afriforum failed to establish a causal link between the song and violence, such as farm murders. Judge Edwin Molahlehi emphasized that the song was part of a political expression related to land issues and economic justice, particularly in the context of apartheid-era land dispossession. The EFF's argument that the chant should be understood within a political and historical context, rather than as incitement to violence, was accepted. Afriforum was ordered to pay the EFF's legal costs. The group appealed the decision and in 2024 the Supreme Court of Appeal confirmed the High Court's verdict that the song, as sung during the Senekal incidents, was not hate speech.

== Lyrics ==
Ayasab' amagwala
dubula dubula
ayeah
dubula dubula
ayasab 'a magwala
dubula dubula
awu yoh
dubula dubula
aw dubul'ibhunu
dubula dubula
aw dubul'ibhunu
dubula dubula
aw dubul'ibhunu
dubula dubula
aw dubul'ibhunu
dubula dubula
awe mama ndiyekele
awe mama iyeah
awe mama ndiyekele
awe mama iyo
aw dubul'ibhunu
dubula dubula
aw dubul'ibhunu
dubula dubula
aw dubul'ibhunu
dubula dubula
aw dubul'ibhunu
dubula dubula
Ayasab' amagwala
dubula dubula
ayeah
dubula dubula
ayasab 'a magwala
dubula dubula
iii yoh
dubula dubala
aw dubul'ibhunu
dubula dubula
aw dubul'ibhunu
dubula dubula
aw dubul'ibhunu
dubula dubula
aw dubul'ibhunu
dubula dubula
awe mama ndiyekele
awe mama iyo
awe mama ndiyekele
awe mama iyo
aw dubul'ibhunu
dubula dubula
aw dubul'ibhunu
dubula dubula
aw dubul'ibhunu
dubula dubula
aw dubul'ibhunu
dubula dubula
Ziyarapa lezinja
dubula dubula
ay iyeah
dubula dubula
Ziyarapa lezinja
dubula dubula
ay iiiyo
dubula dubula
Aw dubul'ibhunu
dubula dubula
Aw dubul'ibhunu
dubula dubula
Aw dubul'ibhunu
dubula dubula
Aw dubul'ibhunu
dubula dubula
Ayasab' amagwala
Dubula dubula
Ay iyeah
Dubula dubula
Ayasab' amagwala
Dubula dubula
Ay iyeah

Translation:

The cowards are scared
shoot shoot

shoot shoot
the cowards are scared
shoot shoot

shoot shoot
shoot the Boer
shoot shoot
shoot the Boer
shoot shoot
shoot the Boer
shoot shoot
shoot the Boer
shoot shoot
mother leave me be
oh mother
mother leave me be
oh mother
shoot the Boer
shoot shoot
shoot the Boer
shoot shoot
shoot the Boer
shoot shoot
shoot the Boer
shoot shoot
the cowards are scared
shoot shoot

shoot shoot
the cowards are scared
shoot shoot

shoot shoot
shoot the Boer
shoot shoot
shoot the Boer
shoot shoot
shoot the Boer
shoot shoot
shoot the Boer
shoot shoot
mother leave me be
oh mother
mother leave me be
oh mother
shoot the Boer
shoot shoot
shoot the Boer
shoot shoot
shoot the Boer
shoot shoot
shoot the Boer
shoot shoot
these dogs are raping
shoot shoot

shoot shoot
these dogs are raping
shoot shoot

shoot shoot
shoot the Boer
shoot shoot
shoot the Boer
shoot shoot
shoot the Boer
shoot shoot
shoot the Boer
shoot shoot
the cowards are scared
shoot shoot

shoot shoot
the cowards are scared
shoot shoot
