= Refugee Act =

Refugee Act may refer to:

In Canada:

- Immigration and Refugee Protection Act (2001)

In the United States:

- Refugee Relief Act (1953)
- Azorean Refugee Act of 1958
- Migration and Refugee Assistance Act (1962)
- Cuban Adjustment Act (1966)
- Indochina Migration and Refugee Assistance Act (1975)
- Refugee Act of 1980
