= Killing of Brendin Horner =

October killing of a farm manager in Paul Roux, Free State

Coordinates: 28°18′56.2″S 28°01′36.9″E

Brendin Horner
- Died: 1 October 2020 (aged 21); DeRots farm, Paul Roux, South Africa
- Cause of death: Homicide by strangulation
- Body discovered: 2 October 2020
- Known for: Farm attack victim

Brendin 'Choppie' Horner (c. 1999 – 1 October 2020) was a 21-year-old South African farm manager for the Bloukruin Estate at Paul Roux, Free State, who was killed by a suspected stock thief or thieves. His body was recovered at DeRots farm outside Paul Roux, and two suspects were taken into custody. Horner's death heightened tensions in South Africa's ongoing farm attacks situation, and the first appearances of the two suspects at Senekal's Magistrate's Court was accompanied by protest action by political and civil rights groups, as well as far right groups that alleged Horner's murder was an example of so-called “white genocide”.

== Murder ==
Horner was reported missing on 1 October 2020 by his girlfriend. After searching throughout the night he was found after daybreak on the 2nd of October by his father, Robbie, and colleague Jaco Kleingeld. A knife placed on top of Horner's cap led them to his body, which was found some 400 metres from his home on the DeRots farm outside Paul Roux. Horner was found tied to a metal fence post with a girdle and a woven, black rope around his neck. He had stab wounds to his head, face, shoulder, arm and hands, and appeared to have been tortured and strangled. Horner had injuries to his fists, which suggested that he fought back, and scrape marks on his body which suggested that he was dragged on the ground. The police were then called to the scene. The autopsy indicated strangulation as the cause of death.

At 19:45 on Thursday evening, when Horner was likely dead, security camera footage spotted his Toyota Hilux pickup truck in Fateng Tse Ntsho township in Paul Roux. The next morning the pickup truck was found 15 km away at Duikfontein farm, along the N5 route to Bethlehem. Blood stains believed to be that of two different men were found in the vehicle. The morning after the murder, witnesses noticed three men with blood-stained clothes arriving from a mountain in the vicinity of the murder scene. On the 3rd of October police arrested two suspects, Sekwetje Isaiah Mahlamba (32) and Sekola Piet Matlaletsa (44) at Fateng tse Ntsho, a township outside Paul Roux. Their clothes and shoes were bloodstained and were sent for forensic tests.

== Court proceedings ==
Judge Deon van Rooyen found that a prima facie case existed against Mahlamba, who was not released on bail. Matlaletsa, who has a long list of previous convictions, was released on bail as the state did not have a strong case against him. He was hardly out of custody however, before he was arrested again on an unrelated stock theft charge. Magistrate Buti Mlangeni denied bail to André Pienaar (51) who allegedly incited unrest when proceedings commenced on 6 October, finding that Pienaar would likely interfere with witnesses and jeopardise the administration of justice. The Free State High Court overturned the ruling however, and set Pienaar's bail at R15,000

In November 2021, the court found that the DNA samples taken from the murder victim did not match the accused, and the two were acquitted on the grounds that the evidence could not link them to Horner's murder.

== Reactions ==
Horner's killing was condemned by agricultural groups. The Freedom Front Plus released a statement in which they condemned the killing of Horner. The Democratic Alliance welcomed the arrests of the two suspects. Lobby group AfriForum called farm attacks a "form of terrorism". Horner's killing was also used as propaganda to fuel the White genocide conspiracy theory in regard to South African farm attacks, with attempts by alt right groups to claim the attack was an anti-white hate crime opposed to a non-racial violent crime.

=== Protests in Senekal ===
On 6 October 2020, agricultural leaders and community members protested outside the Senekal Magistrate Court, where Mahlamba and Matlaletsa appeared before Magistrate Mlangeni. Unrest broke out when André Pienaar and a group of protesters stormed the court buildings in an attempt to get to Mahlamba and Matlaletsa. A police vehicle was overturned and set on fire, as the protesters forced their way towards the holding cells, which they damaged or tried to set on fire. As the protesters entered the court buildings, two gunshots allegedly went off and stun grenades were fired. Various groups and public figures, including Police Minister Bheki Cele, Justice and Correctional Services Minister Ronald Lamola, Free State Premier Sisi Ntombela and POPCRU condemned the occurrences.

When the two accused applied for bail on the 16th there were brief clashes between the Economic Freedom Fighters and farmers, when the EFF sang "Kill the boer, kill the farmer" at the court house, but the police separated them. Representatives from various organizations, including Unite Against Farm Murders and Attacks, AfriForum, the ANC Youth League and the Institute of Race Relations had also assembled outside the court.

Later in October 2020, President Cyril Ramaphosa called the murder "an appalling act of cruelty" but denounced the claim it was an anti-white hate crime, as well as the claim white farmers are being targeted by black people with mention of South Africa's problems with violent crimes and stating, "the majority of victims … are black and poor." In a later statement in November 2020, the President denounced the racial rhetoric and polarization that characterized the protests at Senekal, and subsequently at Brackenfell High School in the Western Cape.
