= United States Refugee Admissions Program =

U.S. government program

The United States Refugee Admissions Program (USRAP) is a collaboration among federal agencies and non-profits responsible for identifying and admitting qualified refugees for resettlement in the United States. Refugee admission counts under USRAP have varied over time in response to global displacement patterns, domestic political priorities, and national security considerations.

== Overview ==
USRAP provides resettlement opportunities to individuals of "special humanitarian concern" while maintaining national security and preventing fraud.

Each year, the president of the United States, after consultation with Congress, determines refugee admissions ceilings and priorities for the coming fiscal year.

USRAP's goals are:

- Arranging refugee placement, ensuring approved refugees are sponsored and assisted upon arrival in the U.S.
- Providing necessities and core services during the initial resettlement period.
- Promoting self-sufficiency and employment for resettled refugees in coordination with refugee service and assistance programs.

== Historical background ==
=== Origins and development ===
After World War II, non-governmental organizations such as the International Rescue Committee, the Hebrew Immigrant Aid Society (HIAS), and Church World Service played leading roles in early resettlement efforts.

The Displaced Persons Act of 1948 established the first legal framework for refugee admission, allowing the entry of over 400,000 displaced Europeans. Following the Vietnam War, the United States accepted large numbers of Indochinese refugees, prompting the passage of the Refugee Act of 1980, standardizing refugee admissions and establishing a uniform resettlement structure.

Since 1980, over three million refugees have been admitted to the United States under the Act.

=== 21st century developments ===
Refugee admissions fluctuated in the 2010s and 2020s. In 2017, Executive Order 13769 temporarily suspended refugee admissions and reduced the annual ceiling. The limit was later raised under the Biden administration to 125,000 for fiscal years 2022–2025. In October 2025, the Trump administration lowered the annual ceiling to 7,500, the lowest in the history of the program. These changes reflect debates over humanitarian responsibility, border security, and the capacity of federal and local institutions to support refugee resettlement. In FY2026, the program admitted over 7,000 people, all White South Africans except for three Afghans.

== Policy and impact ==
=== Legal definition and eligibility ===
Under the Immigration and Nationality Act, a refugee is a person unable or unwilling to return to their country of nationality due to persecution or a well-founded fear of persecution based on race, religion, nationality, membership in a particular social group, or political opinion.

Applicants must be referred by the UNHCR, a U.S. embassy, or a designated NGO, and undergo multi-stage security and medical screening before admission.

=== Socioeconomic effects ===
Refugees in the United States decrease crime rates and contribute to long-term economic growth, generating more tax revenue than the cost of federal assistance programs.

Refugees’ economic outcomes improve over time when policies support labor market integration, language training, and recognition of prior skills. Long-term impacts depend on local and federal integration capacity.

=== Ongoing challenges ===
There are systemic challenges in coordination among agencies, case processing delays, and inconsistent access to local services. Key issues include insufficient funding for local integration programs, uneven English-language training, and gaps in medical care for vulnerable populations. Migration and resettlement stressors can erode coping resources, contribute to social isolation, and deepen marginalization among refugee families in the United States.

== Program structure ==
=== Government entities ===
USRAP is a collaborative effort among many agencies and departments of the U.S. federal government and a number of non-profit organizations. Three entities make up the federal arm of the USRAP: USCIS, part of the Department of Homeland Security; the Bureau of Population, Refugees, and Migration, part of the Department of State; and the Office of Refugee Resettlement, part of the Department of Health and Human Services.

Other involved agencies include:

- Department of State/Population, Refugees, and Migration: Manages overseas operations and takes the lead in proposing admissions ceilings and processing priorities.
- United Nations High Commissioner for Refugees: Refers cases for resettlement and provides information regarding the worldwide refugee situation.
- Resettlement Support Centers: International organizations that collect and process information, such as file preparation and storage, data collection, and out-processing activities.
- Department of Homeland Security: U.S. Citizenship and Immigration Services adjudicates applications for refugee status and reviews case decisions; the Bureau of Customs and Border Protection screens arriving refugees at the port of entry.
- International Organization for Migration: Department of State contractors serve primarily as travel agents in certain locations.
- Non-Governmental Organizations: Provide resettlement assistance and services to arriving refugees.

==== U.S. Citizenship and Immigration Services (USCIS) ====
USCIS is responsible for the legal work of USRAP operations. It processes refugee and permanent residency applications and issues documents permitting refugees to return to the United States after travelling abroad. Coordination between USCIS and other agencies ensures refugees are admitted efficiently while meeting security and legal requirements.

==== Bureau of Population, Refugees, and Migration ====
As part of the U.S. Department of State, the Bureau of Population, Refugees, and Migration is responsible for USRAP's operations abroad. Staff primarily perform pass-through operations and do not work directly with refugees. The department works through other organizations, including the International Rescue Committee and various intergovernmental organizations, to provide services to refugees. The Bureau also processes refugee applications.

==== Office of Refugee Resettlement ====
The Office of Refugee Resettlement "provide[s] new populations with the opportunity to maximize their potential in the United States."

The ORR helps refugees adjust to living and working in a new and foreign culture. Effective resettlement support, including housing, employment, and language training, is critical for refugee self-sufficiency and integration.

=== Non-profit affiliates ===
Ten nonprofits are designated to assist with refugee referrals or resettlement:

- Bethany Christian Services
- Church World Service
- Episcopal Migration Ministries
- Ethiopian Community Development Council
- HIAS (Hebrew Immigrant Aid Society)
- International Rescue Committee
- Lutheran Immigration and Refugee Service
- United States Conference of Catholic Bishops
- U.S. Committee for Refugees and Immigrants
- World Relief

Each nonprofit helps refugees become self-sufficient in the United States, providing housing, food, clothing, school enrollment, English language classes, employment, health screenings, and public services. Non-profits ensure refugees access essential services and integrate successfully, though resources are uneven across locations.

==== Church World Service ====
Church World Service works with eight different denominations, the United Methodist Church, United Church of Christ, Reformed Church in America, Presbyterian Church (USA), Evangelical Lutheran Church in America, the Episcopal Church, the Cooperative Baptist Fellowship, and Christian Church (Disciples of Christ). Along with the basic public services provided by every nonprofit, the Church World Service administers the Religious Services Program, a program which helps refugees continue to practice their religion in the U.S.

==== HIAS ====
HIAS (founded as the Hebrew Immigrant Aid Society) works within the Jewish Communal Network Commission to provide basic services to refugees. HIAS created the Refugee Family Enrichment program that addresses the problems a refugee family may face during resettlement. As part of their resettlement program through USRAP, HIAS teaches communication and conflict resolution skills that help families work through the difficulties of resettlement.

=== Budget and funding ===
During 2011, USRAP received $302 million from the federal government to fund its programs. Funding increased to $417 million in 2012, then dropped back to $310 million in 2013. Some money funds public and private non-profit organizations providing initial services and assisting refugees to achieve self-sufficiency.

=== Refugee eligibility ===
According to USRAP, "A refugee is someone who has fled from his or her home country and cannot return because he or she has a well-founded fear of persecution based on religion, race, nationality, political opinion or membership in a particular social group." Once a refugee has fled their country, there is an intensive process before they can be admitted into the United States. The process aims to take eight months to a year, but actually takes much longer. Once a refugee has been admitted, the sponsoring organization is responsible for helping them adapt to their new life.

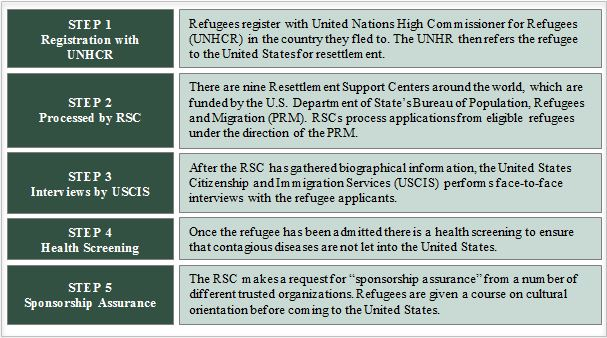
Table 1

== Services ==
=== Cash assistance ===
The USRAP cash assistance program has come under scrutiny for not considering individual circumstances, with the level of support being essentially random. Depending on their location, some refugees are given transportation assistance, Temporary Assistance for Needy Families support, and local community assistance, while other refugees are given the bare minimum of federal funding. This inequitable allocation leads to the successful integration of some refugees while others are left behind.

=== Employment ===
The purpose of cash assistance is to help refugees find employment. This goal, however, is frequently not achieved. "…The cash assistance received was not enough to cover basic expenses and often ran out long before employment was secured." Limited time and funding for support can shorten the employment assistance period, sometimes to less than six months. This lack of time and funding results in a push for quick, insufficient employment rather than full, sustaining careers.

Refugees are often placed in short-term jobs that may not match their skills, education, or experience. The reason behind this push is that the goal is not that of long-term self-sustainability, but rather of self-sustainability by the end of the "eight"-month refugee assistance.

These short-term jobs have above minimum wage pay, but the average wage per hour for full-time workers obtained by refugees within four months of arrival was $8.67 in 2009. This rate is insufficient for refugees who provide for their families. Many face eviction and eventual unemployment. This quick employment issue greatly affects the refugees' ability to be self-sustaining. In fiscal year 2007, ORR's performance data show that between 59 percent and 65 percent of all refugees receiving cash assistance from ORR's four assistance programs entered employment within 4 to 8 months of coming to the United States. There are mechanisms in place to allow for refugees to transfer their professional degrees; however, these transfers require recertification that costs as much as $1,000. Research shows that refugees’ employment outcomes vary based on their education and work experience, as well as how effectively local agencies coordinate services. Over time, refugees often contribute more in taxes than the federal support they initially receive.

=== English language ===
If a refugee cannot speak English, their job employment opportunities may be limited. "The ability to speak English can greatly facilitate a refugee's chances of finding employment." USRAP does provide English language classes. There is, however, a wide array of problems with these classes: inadequate facilities, no longevity, poor teacher quality, and lack of transportation to classes.

Because of the large percentage of refugees that need English classes, facilities are not expansive enough to cover the need. "Limited funding means training provision typically stops at English language training during the early resettlement period". This correlates directly with the refugees' ability to obtain employment. Approximately 90 percent of refugees who were living on government welfare programs did not speak English.

It is also important to note that access to English classes and integration programs varies widely depending on the location, meaning some refugees receive strong support while others face significant gaps.

=== Healthcare ===
In addition to employment assistance, USRAP is also responsible for the health, both mental and physical, of refugees entering the United States. According to our bylaws, refugee resettlement agencies are".

This responsibility becomes a problem when a high percentage of entering refugees have health issues. As the literature points out, this is a growing reality for the United States: "The number of refugees with chronic untreated medical and mental health conditions continues to grow. Needy refugees who do not qualify for Medicaid are limited to up to eight months of Refugee Medical Assistance (RMA)." There are reasons why so many refugees suffer from poor mental and physical health:

Because the United States has admitted an increased number of refugees who have spent many years living in difficult conditions, such as refugee camps, a larger proportion of recently arrived refugees have health and other issues that make it difficult for them to work and achieve self-sufficiency.

As one article posited, this rise in mental illness among refugees calls for better training for psychologists in working with diverse populations: hopefully, with better training, psychologists of refugees will be able to better address their specific health needs. USRAP has an obligation to improve health services for the incoming refugee population.

== Current issues ==
=== U.S. foreign policy issues ===
At times, the United States foreign policy has had negative implications for the lives of the refugees that USRAP aims to serve. Although official United States procedure states that foreign policy should have no impact on refugee admissions, this has not always been the case. For example, after 9/11, some Afghan refugee arrivals were delayed due to security concerns.

This use of refugee admissions programs to further national interests is not uncommon. Historical refugee admissions policies sometimes excluded refugees due to political or economic concerns. This treatment was justified by some because of fears concerning the refugees' possible impacts on the American economy.During the Cold War, refugee admissions were also influenced by geopolitical goals.

However, the interplay between United States refugee admissions and foreign policy is not entirely one-sided. A 2012 USRAP report to Congress states that United States involvement in discussions and actions concerning refugee resettlement has given the United States the opportunity to advance human rights as well as influence other countries to be more open to accepting refugees. The example given in the report is that of Bhutanese refugees. Because the United States offered resettlement, other countries demonstrated a greater willingness to accept refugees as well.

=== Local government issues ===
USRAP also faces challenges with domestic resettlement policies. A report, The report Abandoned Upon Arrival highlights challenges faced by local communities, points out that local communities have confronted many challenges due to refugee resettlement. In the study, seven main findings were reported concerning the local resettlement communities.

First, the federal government uses "faith-based groups," for refugee placement. Local agencies are required to regularly consult with local governments. Receiving new refugees into a community requires numerous resources from the local government, but these local governments are not given enough funding from the federal government. They are also not informed as to how many new refugees they are going to receive. This has been a heavy burden for the local governments.

Second, the refugees' language barriers, caused by a lack of adequate language instruction, prevent the refugees from communicating effectively concerning important issues such as health. USDHS conducted a study in 2008, showing that the better language skills refugees have, the better outcomes they obtain. Schools often cannot provide extra English instruction due to a lack of government funding.

Third, regardless of each refugee's situation in regards to education, health, or psychological background, the government has applied a "one-size-fits-all assistance" approach. This impedes the local governments' ability to accommodate the refugees according to their needs, and to prepare or teach them in areas where they are weak.

Fourth, while the Federal Government has increased funding for refugees, this does not fix the current problems.

Fifth, insufficient funding after initial support for resettlement has created a difficult economic climate for the local communities.

Sixth, the current resettlement system not only is a burden, but also inhibits services for other refugees who have already been resettled.

In order to help the cities and refugees with these problems, this study suggests seven strategies for improvement: (1) ensure the local leaders involvement in decision-making processes, (2) provide better language courses, (3) establish strategies in education, (4) remove "one-size-fits-all assistance", (5) improve accountability, (6) search for innovative models, and (7) promote community engagement.

=== Administrative issues ===
Program fragmentation and poor coordination among agencies create unnecessary burdens for refugees and local communities, making it harder for them to access services. These issues include essential quantitative or qualitative data that are missing or have not been released to further support service programs that could continue to provide aid, care systems that inhibit access to supportive services due to personal bias, and an employment-first approach to refugee resettlement that fails to acknowledge and accommodate the financial and educational inequities faced by refugees.

==== Failure to share information ====
Many of these problems associated with USRAP begin with a lack of information sharing between the agencies involved. Much of the information gathered from refugees is not shared between agencies to ensure that the placement meets the needs of the refugee. For the most part, such information is only gathered to help support the individual's persecution claim. At no point during the resettlement process does a government employee or contracted party have the responsibility to investigate and report "the presence of a needs-related vulnerability for the purposes of ensuring post-arrival assistance. Instead, such information is only gathered to help support the individual's persecution claim."

This information is used to assess the admissibility of the refugee. In fact, resettlement agencies must make placement decisions before they even receive the medical records of refugees.

One of the most crucial factors in the success of refugees is where they are placed in the United States. Even though the most vulnerable populations are being targeted for resettlement, these vulnerabilities are not being communicated to the placing agencies. No structured system exists in USRAP for the collection and distribution of refugee information for planning purposes. This failure to share information down the resettlement chain hurts the resettled refugees and the success of USRAP.

Bureaucratic care assistance

Regarding access issues, scholars note the relationship between the bureaucratic systems which offer support services to refugees as creating issues as well. They note that professionals such as case managers act with bias, inhibiting the care appropriate and necessary for the well-being and success of refugees. In this sense, case managers or providers of accessibility services for refugees within the United States act not as successful care providers, but as inhibitors or gatekeepers to essential services. Alternatively, there are current debates regarding the notion that refugees have little power in the relationship between receiver and giver and support services. They argue that due to the fact that refugees always have the choice to listen, accept, or behave according to the suggestions posed by their support service provider, they have the ability to dictate the kind of relationship that is maintained between themselves and their care provider.

==== Failure to coordinate/monitor refugees ====
Because critical information is not always considered when a placement decision is made, it is not surprising that many refugees leave the locations of original placement to look for better opportunities elsewhere. In many instances, refugees will seek out communities of fellow country-of-origin nationals. Current legislation recognizes this secondary migration as a "natural and expected phenomenon." However, there are no tools or tracking systems in place to manage this phenomenon. USRAP takes no measures in anticipating foreseeable trends in secondary migration by refugees. When refugees move, they get lost in the system and their federal assistance money does not follow them. Consequently, these secondary migration refugees lose out on a part of their eight months of cash and medical treatment.

The work-first approach

Currently, scholars argue that USRAP's emphasis on obtaining employment rapidly and efficiently leaves refugees unable to utilize support systems such as social service programs, due to employment being framed as the priority rather than suggesting that refugees should aim toward obtaining housing, financial, and or language support services before entering the workforce. Furthermore, critics have additionally noted that resettlement programs which emphasize employment as a priority also struggle to provide educational programs that enable refugees to acclimate to their new environments, which inhibits economic progression or career advancement.

An additional issue noted by scholars is that employment-based refugee resettlement programs often emphasize employment without recognizing that educational credentials are needed for professions that pay enough to support a refugee's family. Furthermore, even when refugees find themselves within educational pathways, they often drop out early due to financial or familial reasons.
