= Embassy of the United States, Pretoria =

Diplomatic mission of the United States of America to the Republic of South Africa

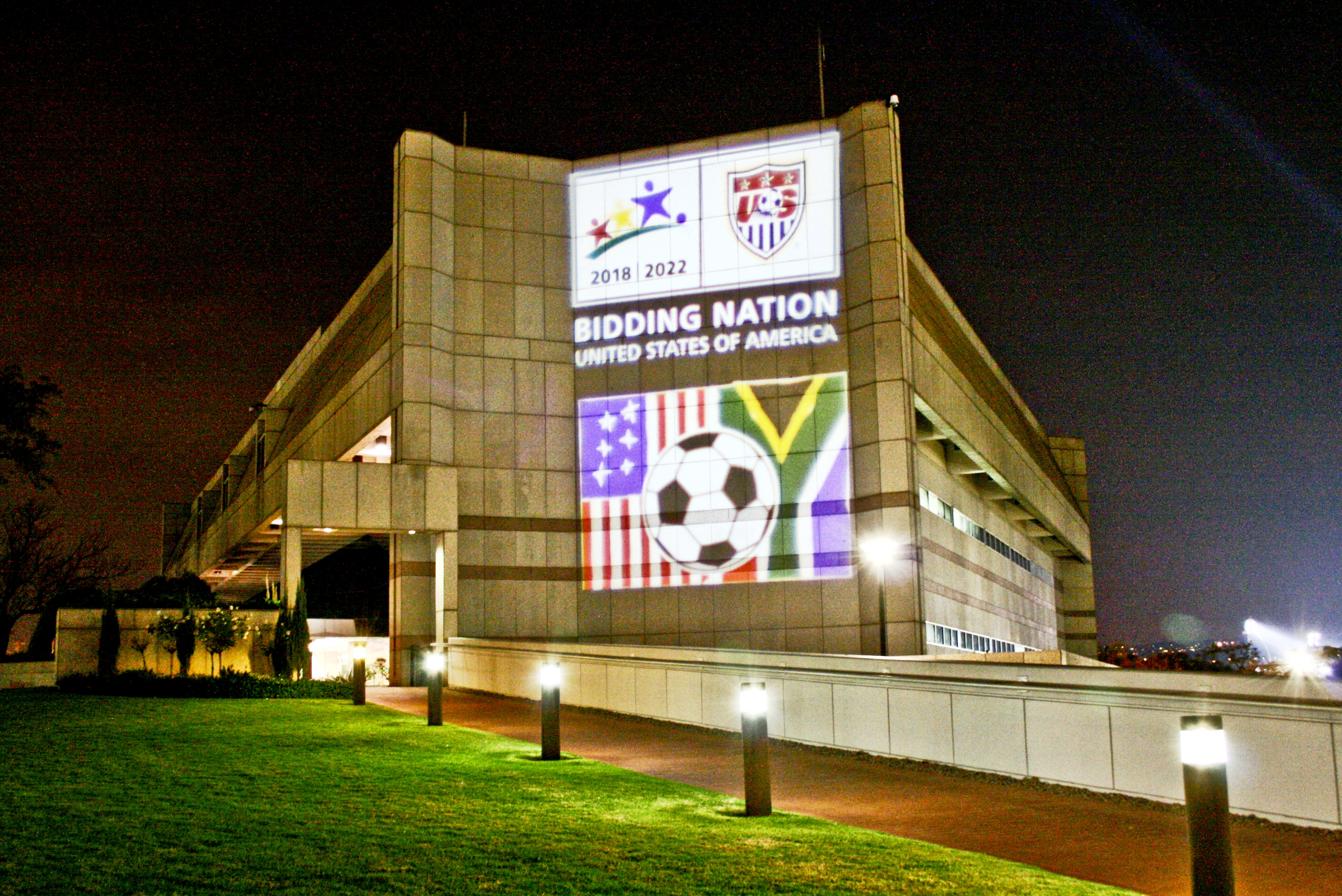
- Location: Pretoria, South Africa
- Address: 877 Pretorius St, Arcadia, Pretoria, 0083, South Africa
- Coordinates: 25°44′46″S 28°13′26″E
- Website: https://za.usembassy.gov

The Embassy of the United States in Pretoria is the diplomatic mission of the United States of America in South Africa.

== History ==
The United States recognized the Union of South Africa on November 5, 1929, with President Herbert Hoover accepting the credentials of Eric Louw as diplomat of the Union of South Africa.

On December 21, 1948, the legations of South Africa and the United States were elevated to embassy status. This took effect on March 3, 1949, when H. T. Andrews presented his credentials as Ambassador Extraordinary and Plenipotentiary of South Africa to President Harry S. Truman, and on March 23, 1949, when North Winship presented his credentials in a similar capacity for the United States to the Government of the Union of South Africa.

The Republic of South Africa was established on May 31, 1961, and that day, U.S. Ambassador Joseph C. Satterthwaite was reaccredited to the new republic.

During the subsequent decades and especially from the 1960s through early 1990s, relations between the United States and South Africa were significantly affected by South Africa's policy of apartheid. Following the Sharpeville massacre, President John F. Kennedy's administration was taking a renewed look at the country.

== See also ==
- Embassy of South Africa, Washington, D.C.
- List of ambassadors of the United States to South Africa
- South Africa–United States relations
