= West African Union of Tax Institutes =

- Formation: 11 May 2011
- Type: Professional association
- Headquarters: Abuja, FCT, Nigeria
- Region served: West Africa
- Official language: English, French
- President: Mr. Mike Kofi Afflu
- Website: http://www.wauti.org/

The West African Union of Tax Institutes (WAUTI) is an association formed by the Chartered Institute of Taxation of Nigeria (CITN) and the Chartered Institute of Taxation of Ghana (CITG) with the objective of developing and promoting the taxation profession in West Africa. A nationally recognized taxation institute or organization in a West African country is eligible for full membership.

== Inauguration ==
The union was inaugurated on 11 May 2011 by James Victor Gbeho, President of the Economic Community of West African States (ECOWAS). The ceremony was held during the 13th Annual Tax Conference organized by the CITN. The first president of the union is Prince Rasaq 'Kunle Quadri, former president of the CITN. Speaking at the inauguration, Quadri stated that the WAUTI, which was being funded by the CITN and CITG, needed about $136,776 for the first year of operation. This would cover capital requirements, wages and other operational expenses. Speaking to reporters, Quadri said "it is a matter of concern that the level of tax awareness in the sub-region is abysmally low when viewed against the backdrop of the benefits that would accrue from a focused and conscious efforts at developing the sector".

== Executives ==
As of September 2013 the president of the union was Mike Kofi Afflu who also doubles as the President of the Chartered Institute of Taxation, Ghana. The Vice President was Mark Antony Chidolue Dike, who was also the president of the Chartered Institute of Taxation of Nigeria. The Honorary Treasurer of the Union was Adesina Adedayo, who had been the pioneer treasurer from inauguration. The Honorary Secretary was Oumar Traore from Cote D'ivoire.

== Membership ==
In April 2011 Quadri noted that in addition to Ghana, CITN had been promoting tax institutes in other West African countries. He said that Liberia, Gambia and Benin were close to launching their individual tax institutes. Soon after formation of the WAUTI, in June 2011 a stakeholders meeting kicked of the process for forming the Association of African Tax Institutes (AATI). The AATI will be formally inaugurated in South Africa in October 2011 during the Annual Tax Conference of the South Africa Institute of Taxation.

== Policy ==
At the conference where WAUTI was launched, Quadri called on the Nigerian Federal Government to overhaul the tax laws to bring them into line with global best practices and to remove unrealistic provisions. Gbeho said he wanted the WAUTI to be a platform of developing and harmonizing tax policies in West Africa. Gbeho noted that the ECOWAS countries had agreed on a minimum 20% ratio of revenue to gross domestic product (GDP), which was required if ECOWAS was to establish a monetary union, as had been discussed. However, only Cape Verde and Ghana had met this criterion. The other 13 countries fell below the 20% target.
