= CITG =

CITG may refer to:

- Triphosphoribosyl-dephospho-CoA synthase, an enzyme
- Chartered Institute of Taxation, Ghana
- Commission of Inquiry on Tigray Genocide
