= Fiduciary Institute of Southern Africa =

Professional association in South Africa

Fiduciary Institute of Southern Africa (FISA)
- Company type: Non-profit professional association
- Founded: 2008
- Key people: Eben Nel, Chairperson (2023); Louis van Vuren (CEO)
- Members: 700+
- Website: www.fisa.net.za

The Fiduciary Institute of Southern Africa (FISA) is a non-profit professional organisation. It represents fiduciary practitioners and sets high minimum standards for the industry .

== Formation and activities ==
FISA was formed in 2008, when the Association of Trust Companies in South Africa (ATCSA), which was formed in 1932, was converted to a professional institute with individual membership. A new constitution was adopted to reflect the change of name and membership. Prior to the change, members were the main trust companies in South Africa on a corporate membership basis. After the change, members include employees of trust companies and individuals from the legal, accounting and financial planning professions.

FISA has approximately 700 individual members, who collectively manage assets in excess of R250 billion. They draft tens of thousand wills each year and administer around 50 percent of deceased estates reported to the offices of the Master of the High Court in South Africa. FISA also offers candidate membership for those wishing to enter the profession.

Activities of FISA members include estate planning, the drafting of wills, administration of trusts and estates, beneficiary funds, tax and financial advice and the management of client funds.

The organization is governed by a 10-person Council; as of 2023, the Chairperson was Eben Nel. Regional councilors represent the Northern, Gauteng, Central, Western Cape, Eastern Cape, and KwaZulu Natal regions. FISA liaises with the Master's Office and the South African Revenue Service in order to participate in optimising legal and compliance processes. It engages with the South African Treasury on issues that affect the industry and the public.

== Education ==
FISA aims to raise awareness and standards of fiduciary practice through education to benefit both practitioners and the public. FISA holds an annual conference at which practitioners and academics in the fiduciary field present and discuss topical issues. In 2011 FISA introduced a professional examination, in co-operation with the School of Financial Planning Law at the University of Free State, which gives successful candidates the designation of Fiduciary Practitioner of South Africa (FPSA). FISA also has a Bursary Trust Fund, through which it pays for the tuition of successful applicants.

== Outreach ==
FISA works actively to educate the public about fiduciary issues. It has a public helpdesk on its website which contains a complaints procedure and consumer education on executorships, Wills, and trusts. For the benefit of both its members and the public, the institute makes available the latest court decisions on fiduciary matters. The organization also has an active media campaign through which it educates journalists on fiduciary matters.

== Affiliations ==
FISA has strategic alliances with other professional bodies such as the South African Institute of Tax Practitioners, the Law Society of South Africa and the Financial Planning Institute with which it signed a memorandum of understanding in 2012.
