= Rasaq =

Rasaq is a given name. Notable people with the name include:

- Rasaq Malik (born 1992), Nigerian poet
- Rasaq Adekunle Quadri, Nigerian accountant
- Rasaq Tanimowo (born 1992), Nigerian weightlifter
- Abdul Rasaq Akeem (born 2001), Singaporean footballer
- Ademola Rasaq Seriki (1959–2022), Nigerian politician
