= Rasaq Adekunle Quadri =

Nigerian accountant

President, CITN
- In office June 2009 – June 2011

President, WAUTI
- Incumbent
- Assumed office May 2011

Rasaq Adekunle Quadri is a Nigerian accountant who was President of the Chartered Institute of Taxation of Nigeria (CITN) from 2009 to 2011, and was elected the first President of the West African Union of Tax Institutes (WAUTI) in March 2011.

== Birth and education ==
Quadri was born in Lagos State, Nigeria. His father was a tax practitioner and chartered accountant, while his mother was a businesswoman. He attended the Federal Polytechnic, Idah, in Kogi State, where he obtained a Higher National Diploma in Accountancy in 1985.

In May 1987, he qualified as a Chartered Accountant after passing the examinations of the nstitute of Chartered Accountants of Nigeria (ICAN). He became an associate member of the Chartered Institute of Taxation of Nigeria (CITN) in 1990 and was later awarded fellowship status by both ICAN and CITN in 1995.

== Professional career ==
Quadri began work as an Audit Trainee with Ogunbajo Okubule & Co. in 1982. He worked in his father's firm, Oladipupo Quadri & Co. (Chartered Accountants), working up to the position of Partner, Technical. He became Managing Partner of his own firm, Rasaq Quadri & Co., Managing Consultant or Marrs Consults and non executive director of Fabo Petroleum Company Limited. On 4 June 2009 Quadri was elected President and Chairman of CITN for a two-year term. During his period in office there was an ongoing dispute with the ICAN. At CITN's May 2011 annual tax conference the president of ICAN, Sebastian Owuama, called for an end to the dispute, an initiative that was welcomed by Quadri. His term as president of the CITN ended on 1 June 2011.

In February 2011 Quadri was elected the first President of the West Africa Union of Tax Institutes (WAUTI). WAUTI is seen as a step towards establishing an Association of Africa Tax Institutes (AATI). After being elected, Quadri noted the close relations between the CITN, Chartered Institute of Taxation of Ghana (CITG) and South African Institute of Tax Practitioners (SAIT). He also mentioned that CITN was planning to introduce new exchange programs with the Chartered Institute of Taxation (CIOT), United Kingdom. During a March 2011 visit to CIOT headquarters, Quadri met his counterpart Peter Fanning and discussed CITN's tax certification, the value of CIOT's Advanced Diploma in International Taxation (ADIT) and ways in which to strengthen the relationship between CITN and CIOT. In April 2011 Quadri noted that in addition to Ghana, CITN had been promoting tax institutes in other West African countries. He said that Liberia, Gambia and Benin were close to launching their individual tax institutes.

== Opinions ==
Quadri has criticised Nigerian tax laws, describing them as outdated and saying they do not provide a conducive environment for people to pay taxes. He advocates greater emphasis on consumption tax, or VAT. He has said that most payments that Nigerians make to state governments are not taxes but levies, fees and usually extortions. According to Quadri "CITN is advocating that every chairman of state board of internal revenue should be a tax professional duly recognised by our institute". Quadri has also noted that because a group of companies in Nigeria cannot consolidate their taxes, "the holding company may be exposed to multiple taxes".

In March 2011 Quadri welcomed an initiative by the Central Bank of Nigeria ro encourage electronic payment of taxes. He said "the initiative is a welcome idea that is long overdue, considering the global trend of cashless environment ... if effectively implemented. It would facilitate the productivity of our members (Chartered Tax Professionals) working with the stakeholder tax authorities, and reduce to the barest minimum incidences of touting and embezzling of tax payer's monies." He did however raise some concerns, saying issues to be addressed included training and education, IT infrastructure, data formatting, security and data protection.
