= Land reform in South Africa =

Land reform in South Africa has been implemented through a slow market-based program to redistribute land to the black majority in the country. South Africa is one of the world's most unequal countries due to the legacy of colonial and later apartheid laws that dispossessed black South Africans of their lands and confined most land to the white minority. Under apartheid, the best agricultural land was in white-designated areas and white farmers were heavily subsidized whereas black farmers were restricted to low-quality land, overcrowding, and near non-existent subsidies.

With the end of apartheid in 1994, the South African black-led government introduced land reforms where the state could buy the land back from farmers at market value in order to return it to claimants who had been dispossessed of their land or provide grants to assist those without a claim of dispossession to purchase land. By 2016, the land reform program had only redistributed 11% of the land. The program has been criticized for inefficiencies, corruption and lack of farmer support, as well as for relying on slow and market-based solutions. In 2022, it was estimated that 24% of farmland had been redistributed from white to black ownership through both private market acquisition and government-sponsored land redistribution.

== Details ==
The Land Reform Process focused on three areas: restitution, land tenure reform and land redistribution. Restitution, the government compensating (monetary) individuals who had been forcefully removed, has been very unsuccessful, and the policy has now shifted to redistribution with secure land tenure. Land tenure reform is a system of recognizing people's right to own land and therefore control it.

Redistribution is the most important component of land reform in South Africa. Initially, land was bought from its owners (willing seller) by the government (willing buyer) and redistributed, in order to maintain public confidence in the land market.

In 2000, the South African government decided to review and change the redistribution and tenure process to a more decentralised and area based planning process. The idea is to have local integrated development plans in 48 districts, which includes more community participation and redistribution taking place, but the system addresses various concerns and challenges.

They include the use of third parties, agents accredited by the state, and who are held accountable to the government. The result has been local land holding elites dominating the system in many of these areas. The government still hopes that with "improved identification and selection of beneficiaries, better planning of land and, ultimately, greater productivity of the land acquired..." the land reform process will begin moving faster.

As of early 2006, the ANC government announced that it will start expropriating the land, but according to the country's chief land claims commissioner, Tozi Gwanya, unlike in Zimbabwe, there will be compensation to those whose land is expropriated, "but it must be a just amount, not inflated sums."

In South Africa, the main model of land reforms implemented was based on the market-led agrarian reform (MLAR) approach. Within the MLAR, the strategic partnership (SP) model was implemented in seven claimant communities in Levubu in the Limpopo province. The SP model was implemented between 2005 and 2008 that ended up in a fiasco leading to creation of conflict between several interested parties.

On 1 September 2010, the National Rural Youth Service Corps (NARYSEC) was launched by the Department of Rural Development and Land Reform to provide and recruit rural youth specifically dependents of military veterans between the ages of 18 and 25 with skills development and to serve their communities by providing a 24-month training program at South African military bases.

In 2012, Reuters wrote about a black farmer who was working on land that the government had bought from its previous white owner as part of the country's land reform. According to Reuters, the land was now owned by the government, not the black farmer. The black farmer said that because of this, he could not use the land as collateral to get a loan from a bank.

On 20 December 2017, the ANC-led government announced at the 54th National Conference that it will seek to amend Section 25 of the South African Constitution regarding property rights to implement land expropriation without compensation (EWC). At the conference, a resolution was passed to grant ownership of traditional land to the respective communities, about 13% of the country, usually registered in trust like the Ingonyama Trust under the name of traditional leaders to the respective communities.

In February 2018, the Parliament of South Africa passed a motion to review the property ownership clause of the constitution, to allow for the expropriation of land, in the public interest, without compensation, which was widely supported within South Africa's ruling party on the grounds that the land was originally seized by whites without just compensation. South African officials claim that the land reforms will be different from Zimbabwe's land reforms in that South Africa's plan is "constitutional" and "subject to laws and the constitution," unlike Zimbabwe's process, which was overseen by Robert Mugabe. The effort to pass the amendment eventually failed.

In August 2018, the South African government began the process of taking two white-owned farmlands by filing papers seeking to acquire the farms via eminent domain for one tenth of the owners' estimated value, which, in one case, was based on possible value when the farm is developed into an eco-estate. The expropriation was overruled, and the owners later sold the lands for about four times what the government offered. According to a 2017 government audit, 72 percent of the nation's private farmland is owned by white people, who make up 9 percent of the population.

== Financial and Fiscal Commission's 2016 report ==
As of 2016, the South African government has spent more than R60 billion on land reform projects since 1994. Despite this investment, the land reform program has not stimulated development in the targeted rural areas. A report by the South African Government's Financial and Fiscal Commission shows that land reform as a mechanism for agricultural development and job creation has failed. A survey by the commission in Limpopo province, KwaZulu-Natal and the Eastern Cape found that most land reform farms show little or no agricultural activity, the land reform beneficiaries earn little to no income and most seek work on surrounding commercial farms instead of actively farming their own land. If farming is taking place on land reform farms, these farms operate below their full agricultural potential and are mainly used for subsistence agriculture. On average, crop production had decreased by 79% since conversion to land reform. In the three provinces surveyed, job losses averaged 84%, with KwaZulu-Natal suffering a 94% job hemorrhage.

To improve the impacts of land reform, the FFC recommended reprioritizing funding to provide land beneficiaries with proper infrastructure and training, encouraging municipalities to support farmers through discounts and tariff exemptions, and consolidating grant funding for land reform into a single program run by the Department of Agriculture, Forestry, and Fisheries.

== Reforms ==
In October 2019, Parliament began discussing constitutional reforms that would permit the uncompensated seizure of private land. The ANC has laid out a commitment to land redistribution in its manifesto. The exact wording on the proposal was expected in March 2020. In February 2020, President Cyril Ramaphosa said the government intends to accelerate land redistribution in 2020. Ramaphosa indicated that land redistribution was important for redressing the injustice of the 1913 Natives Land Act.

Speaking from Addis Ababa, U.S. Secretary of State Mike Pompeo asserted on February 19, 2020, that land distribution without compensation would be disastrous for South Africa and its people.

The passage of the constitutional amendment eventually failed, though a bill was signed in 2025 that allowed for uncompensated expropriation under narrower circumstances.

== See also ==
- Land reforms by country
- Agriculture in South Africa
