= Expropriation Act, 2024 =

South African legislation

Parliament of South Africa
- Long title: To provide for the expropriation of property for a public purpose or in the public interest; to regulate the procedure for the expropriation of property for a public purpose or in the public interest, including payment of compensation; to identify certain instances where the provision of nil compensation may be just and equitable for expropriation in the public interest; to repeal the Expropriation Act, 1975 (Act No. 63 of 1975); and to provide for matters connected therewith
- Citation: Act No. 13 of 2024
- Territorial extent: Republic of South Africa
- Passed by: National Assembly
- Passed: 29 September 2022
- Passed by: National Council of Provinces
- Passed: 14 May 2023
- Signed: 23 January 2025

Related legislation
- Expropriation Act, 1975
- Status: In force

The Expropriation Act, 2024 (Act No. 13 of 2024) is an act of the Parliament of South Africa that establishes the framework for compulsory property acquisition by South African government entities. The Act envisages the repeal of the apartheid-era Expropriation Act, 1975 and will come into operation on a date determined by the President by proclamation in the Government Gazette.

The Act has been controversial throughout its legislative history, owing in particular to its provision for the payment of "nil compensation" to persons whose land is expropriated in certain specified circumstances. The governing African National Congress has emphasised the importance of the Act in facilitating the land reform objectives contained in the Constitution, whilst the Act has been criticised by, amongst others, the Democratic Alliance, and the Trump administration.

== Provisions ==
The Act defines expropriation as the compulsory acquisition of property by organs of state or authorised "expropriating authorities". The Act provides that its primary purpose is to align South Africa's expropriation processes with the requirements of the Constitution whilst providing clear guidelines for implementation across all levels of government. The Act seeks to assist marginalized communities, including women, youth, LGBTQI+ individuals, and persons with disabilities, by facilitating improved access to services through resource distribution, and "to redress the results of past racial discriminatory laws or practices” in reference to historical apartheid practices.

The Act grants expropriation authority to various state entities across national, provincial, and municipal spheres of government. Ministerial powers include the ability to expropriate property for a public purpose or in the public interest, subject to specific limitations outlined in the Act. The judiciary maintains oversight through its authority to adjudicate expropriation disputes.

=== Property subject to expropriation ===
Under section 25(4)(b) of the Constitution, expropriation provisions extend beyond land to encompass both movable and immovable assets. This broad definition ensures comprehensive coverage of property types subject to potential expropriation.

Legitimate expropriation must satisfy one of two fundamental criteria, namely that it must be conducted for a "public purpose", which encompasses activities directly related to governmental administration and service delivery, such as constructing educational institutions or healthcare infrastructure, or in the "public interest". The public interest is defined in section 25(4)(a) of the Constitution as including initiatives supporting land reform and equitable access to natural resources. Section 25(8) of the Constitution further authorises legislative measures to address historical racial discrimination.

Chapter 7 of the Act introduces mechanisms for temporary property utilisation in urgent circumstances, limited to 12-month periods. However, these provisions exclude properties owned by any tier of government, assets required under the Disaster Management Act and properties protected by judicial orders.

Expropriating authorities must first pursue negotiated settlements with property owners or rights holders. Direct expropriation becomes permissible only after attempts at reaching mutually acceptable terms have proven unsuccessful. This requirement is waived only in specific circumstances involving urgent temporary property usage. In cases of disagreement over expropriation matters, particularly regarding compensation, the judicial system maintains ultimate authority in determining appropriate resolutions through court proceedings.

=== Compensation ===
Chapter 5 of the Act deals with compensation for expropriation. Section 12(1) of the Act provides that the amount of compensation paid to the owner of expropriated land must be "just and equitable reflecting an equitable balance between the public interest, the interests of those affected, including an owner, holder of a right a mortgagee, having regard to all relevant circumstances". These circumstances include the current use of the property, the history of the acquisition and use of the property, the market value of the property, the extent of direct state investment and subsidy in the acquisition and beneficial capital, improvement of the property, and the purpose of the expropriation. Section 12(3) provides that:

It may be just and equitable for nil compensation to be paid where land is expropriated in the public interest, having regard to all relevant circumstances, including but not limited to:

(a) where the land is not being used and the owner’s main purpose is not to develop the land or use it to generate income, but to benefit from appreciation of its market value;

(b) where an organ of state holds land that it is not using for its core functions and is not reasonably likely to require the land for its future activities in that regard, and the organ of state acquired the land for no consideration;

(c) notwithstanding registration of ownership in terms of the Deeds Registries Act, 1937 (Act No. 47 of 1937), where an owner has abandoned the land by failing to exercise control over it despite being reasonably capable of doing so;

(d) where the market value of the land is equivalent to, or less than, the present value of direct state investment or subsidy in the acquisition and beneficial capital improvement of the land.

== Legislative history ==
On 23 January 2025, Cyril Ramaphosa assented to the Expropriation Bill following a five-year process of deliberation beginning on 14 October 2020. His assent to the bill marked the formal replacement of the apartheid-era Expropriation Act, 1975.

== Responses ==
The African National Congress, which initially introduced the legislation during the previous parliament, characterised the Act as a transformative mechanism for advancing land reform whilst promoting economic development and unity. The party connected the legislation to principles outlined in the Freedom Charter regarding equitable land distribution, calling it a "direct response" to "millions of South Africans who have been excluded from land ownership and access to natural resources for far too long".

The legislation's enactment generated significant debate regarding its democratic legitimacy, particularly given the changed parliamentary composition following recent elections. The establishment of a government of national unity, comprising multiple political parties including the ANC, Democratic Alliance, and several others, raised questions about the bill's potential passage under the new political arrangement. The Democratic Alliance announced intentions to contest the law's validity in court.

On 7 February 2025, Donald Trump, the 47th president of the United States, signed an executive order halting foreign aid or assistance delivered or provided to South Africa, to the maximum extent allowed by law and subject to the discretion of the head of the relevant executive agency, on the basis of the enactment of the Expropriation Act and South Africa's genocide case against Israel at the International Court of Justice. Trump allowed 59 Afrikaners to arrive in the US with refugee status, claiming they "are victims of unjust racial discrimination."

== See also ==
- Land reform in South Africa
- Land reform in Zimbabwe
- Land reform in Namibia
