= 48th National Conference of the African National Congress =

Elective meeting of the African National Congress for the year 1991

- 2–7 July 1991

2,244 party delegates
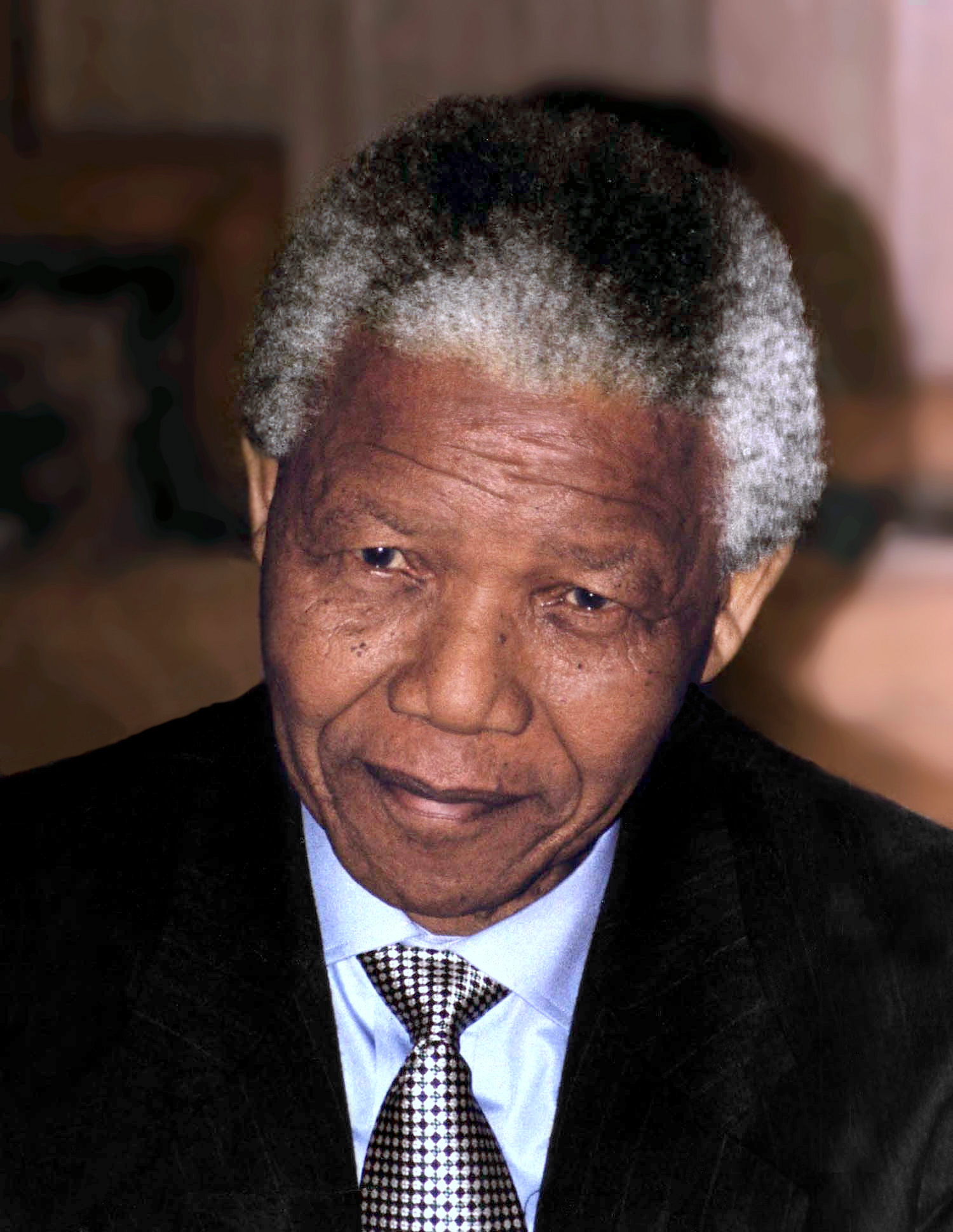
Candidate	Nelson Mandela
Delegate vote	Unopposed
President before election
Oliver Tambo
Elected President
Nelson Mandela

The 48th National Conference of the African National Congress (ANC) took place from 2 to 7 July 1991 at the University of Durban–Westville in Durban, Natal (now KwaZulu-Natal). It was the first national conference of the ANC since the organisation was banned by the apartheid government in 1960 and marked the ascension of Nelson Mandela to the ANC presidency, which since 1967 had been held by Oliver Tambo.

Notably, the conference elected trade unionist Cyril Ramaphosa as secretary general, and elected several United Democratic Front leaders to the ANC National Executive Committee. That shift was taken as reflective of the ongoing broadening of the membership base of the ANC, which since 1990 had begun to re-establish legal structures inside South Africa. This entailed integrating the ANC's headquarters, formerly based in exile, with the ANC's internal underground and recently released political prisoners (such as Mandela), but also entailed incorporating other elements of the internal struggle against apartheid. The conference adopted a new constitution for the organisation, although a proposal by the ANC Women's League to inscribe gender quotas was, controversially, withdrawn.

Held under the theme "People's Power for a Democratic Future", the conference took decisions regarding the organisation's policy in the ongoing negotiations to end apartheid, including the decision to maintain the ANC's armed wing, Umkhonto we Sizwe, in a state of combat readiness. Delegates to the conference also formulated preliminary policy proposals for a post-apartheid government in South Africa. Indeed, in the three years between the 48th National Conference and the next in 1994, the ANC won a majority in the country's first democratic elections and formed a government under Mandela as national president.

== Background ==
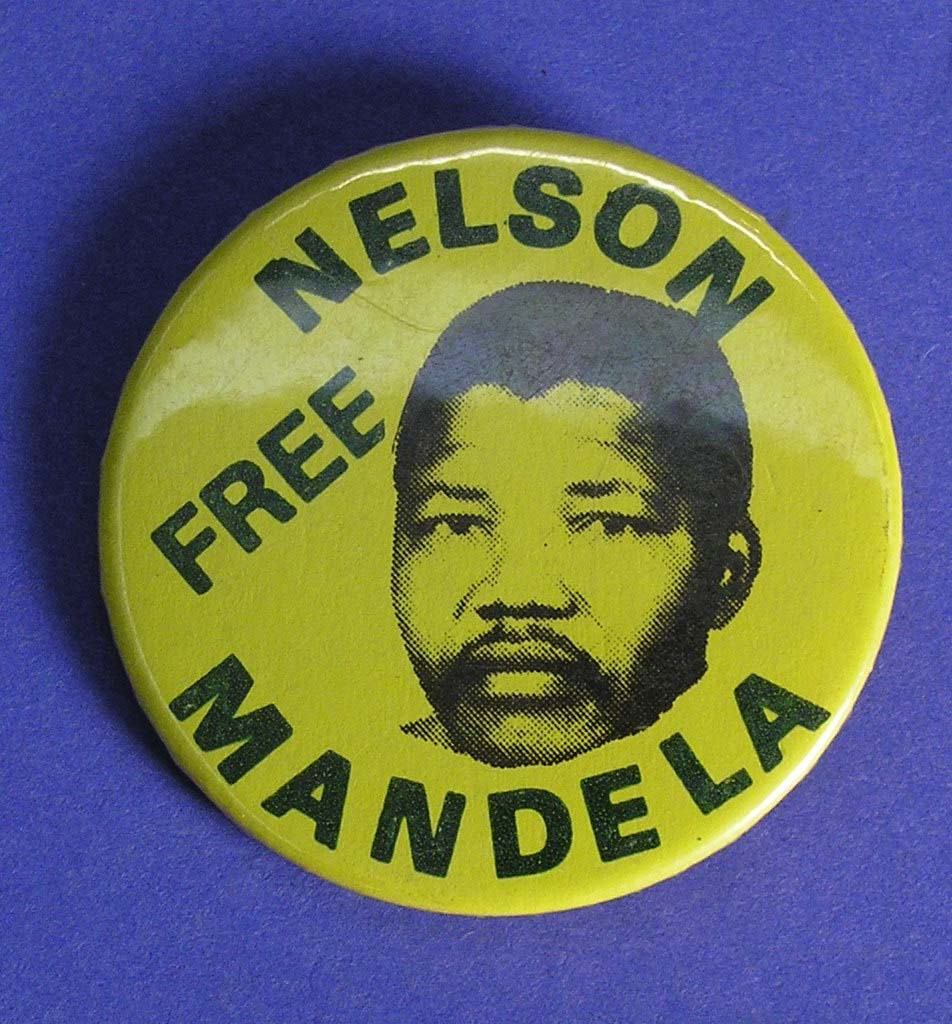
Nelson Mandela left prison on 11 February 1990.

The African National Congress (ANC) was banned by the South African government between 1960 and February 1990. In those three decades, the ANC was based in exile, primarily with headquarters in Lusaka, Zambia, and deviated from its regular governance procedures: in particular, it did not elect its leadership and take policy decisions at annual national conferences, but rather was governed on a fairly ad hoc basis by the incumbent leadership. In the exile period, the organisation held three "consultative" conferences: at Morogoro in 1969, at Kabwe in 1985, and in Johannesburg in 1990. Only at Kabwe in 1985 did the membership elect its leaders, including by confirming the presidency of Oliver Tambo, who until then had been acting president. The Johannesburg conference in 1990 was the first held in South Africa since 1960, but abstained from making major decisions: it resolved to reaffirm the composition of the leadership as elected at Kabwe.

The 48th National Conference was therefore anticipated as a return to the erstwhile ANC norm of democratic decision-making, not only in the selection of a new leadership but also in decision-making about the ANC's strategy during the ongoing negotiations to end apartheid. Since February 1990, the organisation had also set about re-establishing legal structures for members inside South Africa, a process which involved integrating the ANC's membership in exile with elements of the internal movement against apartheid – not only the ANC's internal underground, but also the Mass Democratic Movement (MDM) and its constituent organisations, including the United Democratic Front (UDF) and the trade unions – and also with recently released political prisoners, including but not limited to the Rivonia Triallists. At the time of the conference, the ANC reported a registered membership of 760,000 people; and many of the delegates to the conference were young people, with an average age of 34.

According to the ANC, the conference was also attended by 450 foreign guests from 57 countries, including representatives of 92 foreign organisations such as the Organisation of African Unity, the United Nations Special Committee against Apartheid, and various left-wing political parties. Among ANC delegates from other regions of the country, there was some anxiety about meeting in Natal province, which had been the epicentre of recent political violence between ANC-aligned groups and Inkatha-aligned groups.

== Opening session ==
The theme of the conference was "People's Power for a Democratic Future", and the conference hall, at the University of Durban–Westville, was decorated with banners showing slogans from the Freedom Charter. On 2 July, the opening session of the conference began late – "in true ANC fashion", as one delegate observed – with a prayer delivered by Archbishop Trevor Huddleston of the international Anti-Apartheid Movement. The conference was formerly opened with the political report of the ANC president, which, because Tambo had been weakened by a stroke, was delivered jointly with his deputy, Nelson Mandela. Tambo provided an overview of the ANC's activities in exile since 1960, while Mandela reflected on the ANC's role – as "the repository of the aspirations of the overwhelming majority of our people" – in South Africa's ongoing transition away from apartheid.

== Electoral procedure ==
The 2,244 voting delegates at the conference represented three main categories of ANC membership: the newly established internal regions, inside South Africa; the external regions, in Southern African and Western countries, and also including Umkhonto we Sizwe (MK), the Women's League, and the Youth League; and the chief representatives of the ANC's key departments and various international offices. There were also 117 non-voting delegates present, including from other ANC departments; from the UDF; and from the ANC's Tripartite Alliance partners, the South African Communist Party (SACP) and Congress of South African Trade Unions.

At the request of the ANC – and presumably because of the considerable international interest in the conference's outcomes – all the elections conducted at the conference were organised by the Independent Mediation Service of South Africa and overseen by independent observers. They were held by secret ballot over the course of a day. As the ANC pointed out afterwards in its statement on the conference, most of the delegates had never before voted by this method, given the limited racial suffrage of the apartheid system.

== Leadership election ==
The results of the leadership elections, announced at the end of 6 July after a day-long secret ballot, were as follows (victorious candidates in bold):

Position	Candidate	Votes	%
President	**Nelson Mandela**	Unopposed	
Deputy President	**Walter Sisulu**	**1,567**	**79.18%**
Deputy President	Harry Gwala	412	20.81%
National Chairperson	**Oliver Tambo**	Unopposed	
Secretary General	**Cyril Ramaphosa**	**1,156**	**57.53%**
Secretary General	Alfred Nzo	400	20.12%
Secretary General	Jacob Zuma	450	22.35%
Deputy Secretary General	**Jacob Zuma**	**1,039**	**53.12%**
Deputy Secretary General	Alfred Nzo	258	13.19%
Deputy Secretary General	Popo Molefe	659	33.69%
Treasurer General	**Thomas Nkobi**	**1,277**	**65.25%**
Treasurer General	Mendi Msimang	680	34.75%

The election of Cyril Ramaphosa as Secretary General received particular attention, and was viewed as symbolic of the ANC's new direction and changing membership; Ramaphosa was an internal activist, attending the conference in his capacity as a leader of the National Union of Mineworkers. According to Ramaphosa's biographer, the SACP leadership had encouraged him to run for the position. When his election was announced, delegates carried him to the dais on their shoulders. The other leaders represented more traditional ANC constituencies: Mandela and Walter Sisulu were ANC stalwarts and leading political prisoners on Robben Island, while Tambo and Thomas Nkobi were incumbent leaders of the exiled ANC, and Jacob Zuma was associated with MK. Mandela's ascent to the presidency was not unexpected: Tambo had suffered his stroke in 1989 and, upon his release from prison in 1990, Mandela had assumed the ANC deputy presidency and many of Tambo's duties. The chairmanship, to which Tambo was elected, was a newly created position.

Sisulu was elderly and in poor health after his imprisonment, but told reporters, "If the people that I lead desire that I take a particular position, even though I am hesitating, I will do that". He was reportedly persuaded to accept the deputy presidency in order to avert an acrimonious contest for the position among a younger generation of leaders – particularly between Thabo Mbeki, Tambo's protégé, and Chris Hani, a SACP and MK leader. Indeed, initial nominees for the deputy presidency, selected by the regional branches of the ANC, included not only Sisulu and Harry Gwala but also Mbeki, Hani, and Zuma – although, according to R. W. Johnson, the fact that Inkatha leader Mangosuthu Buthelezi had publicly supported Zuma's candidacy harmed, rather than helped, his prospects. All the nominees, excepting Sisulu and firebrand Gwala, were evidently persuaded to withdraw from the race.

The leadership election results were also taken to indicate the declining influence of Mandela's ex-wife, Winnie Madikizela-Mandela. Ramaphosa was associated with the MDM's public "ostracism" of Madikizela-Mandela due to the conduct of her "football club", and her patron and favoured candidate, Alfred Nzo, was defeated in two votes.

== National Executive Committee elections ==
Following the election of the so-called Top Six leaders, the other fifty members of the National Executive Committee (NEC) – the top executive organ of the ANC – were elected from a list of 130 nominations. The following candidates received the most votes:

1. Chris Hani (1,858 votes)
2. Thabo Mbeki (1,824 votes)
3. Joe Slovo (1,761 votes)
4. Terror Lekota (1,724 votes)
5. Pallo Jordan (1,702 votes)
6. Ahmed Kathrada (1,697 votes)
7. Ronnie Kasrils (1,666 votes)
8. Harry Gwala (1,644 votes)
9. Steve Tshwete (1,634 votes)
10. Arnold Stofile (1,546 votes)

The composition of the committee again represented the broadening of the organisation's base: prominent UDF activists ranked high in the election results, among them Terror Lekota, Steve Tshwete, Popo Molefe, Cheryl Carolus, and Trevor Manuel. Many SACP members were also highly ranked, although it was not possible to judge their proportionate share of NEC seats, since membership in the SACP remained secret.

== Resolutions ==
Between plenary sessions, the delegates attended meetings of commissions appointed to debate various policy issues of significance. The main commissions covered the ANC's "strategy and tactics"; negotiations with the government; international policy; MK; the ANC's organisational development; and the ANC's constitution. The latter commission discussed a draft constitution for the organisation, which was adopted by the plenary. In addition, delegates attended sessions which formulated preliminary policy proposals for a post-apartheid government, such as on education and the national constitution.

=== Negotiations and armed struggle ===
The possibility of eradicating apartheid by peaceful means has emerged through our struggles. The overwhelming majority of South Africans are convinced that the process of peaceful transition to a democratic future must proceed with all deliberate speed. In this regard, we reaffirm our unambiguous commitment to exploring every possible avenue to resolve by peaceful means the problems of our country...
[V]ictory has not yet been won, the danger of repression continues to loom over the people and the possibility of a derailment of the negotiations process exists. Therefore, we will continue to strengthen the people's army, Umkhonto we Sizwe both as a force indispensable to the defence of the people and in preparation for the creation of a truly national army of a democratic South Africa; to maintain such underground formations as are necessary; to intensify mass organisation and mobilisation and to ensure the continued engagement of the international community...

— Declaration of the 48th Conference

Since at least the mid-1980s, and as reflected in the debate about Operation Vula, the top leadership of the ANC and SACP had been embroiled in a debate over the plausibility of a negotiated end to apartheid, and over the question of whether disarmament should be averted to maintain armed struggle as a fallback position. By 1991, serious negotiations to end apartheid were underway, and the ANC had committed to suspending the armed struggle – until then waged under the auspices of MK – in the Pretoria Minute of August 1990. However, at the time of the 48th Conference, talks with the National Party government had stalled, due to the ANC leadership's belief that the government was permitting or even encouraging the ongoing political violence in the country. The delegates at the conference concurred in this suspicion: in an early articulation of the third force theory, the conference described the violence as "counter-revolutionary" and as "perpetrated by agencies of the state". Thus the conference reiterated the ANC's commitment to end apartheid peacefully, but also resolved to maintain and expand MK structures inside the country. It described MK's role as, among other things, defending the ANC's personnel and property, and defending "peace and stability"; and stated, "the ANC shall maintain and develop MK until the adoption of a democratic constitution and the creation of a new defence force into which cadres of MK will be integrated. Until such a point is reached the equipment of the movement shall NOT be surrendered to the regime. MK shall remain in constant combat readiness."

The conference's concern with political violence was ultimately embodied in the September 1991 National Peace Accord. In terms of the ANC's substantive negotiating position, the conference reaffirmed the ANC's existing demands for an interim government and a constituent assembly elected on the basis of one-person, one-vote.

=== Proposed gender quota ===
According to delegates present, the most heated debate of the conference took place on the afternoon of 3 July, when the floor discussed a proposal to include a principle of affirmative action in the organisation's new constitution. This would directly affect the conduct of elections later in the week, because the Women's League had been lobbying for a gender quota which would reserve for women thirty per cent of elected positions, at all levels – including, therefore, fifteen of the fifty seats on the NEC. The proposal had been accepted by the outgoing NEC, by the constitutional committee which had written the draft constitution, and by all the regional branches at an inter-regional workshop; but, at the conference itself, delegates on the constitutional commission proposed that the quota should be dropped from the draft. Delegates had an impassioned debate on the matter: Frene Ginwala, for example, lodged a forceful defence of the quota, while Terror Lekota argued that it would be anti-meritocratic. The question eventually went to a vote, but was disrupted when a delegate announced that the Women's League would abstain from the vote – supporters of the quota pointed out that, because of the lack of affirmative action to date, only seventeen per cent of the delegates to the conference were women, so a vote risked perpetuating the problem that was at issue. The meeting fell apart as delegates began singing and demonstrating in favour of their positions.

As a delegate remembered, "The arguments continued in the toilets, over a cigarette and outside during dinner", and the women held a special caucus during dinner. When the conference reconvened in the evening, Mandela, as outgoing deputy president, appealed that, instead of a vote, the delegates should reach a compromise in order to avoid sowing division. Although delegates reacted to this proposal with scorn, considering it anti-democratic, Mandela convinced the main proponents of a vote – Lekota among them – to back down. The NEC and leadership of the leagues met overnight; in the morning, the President of the Women's League, Gertrude Shope, apologised that the previous day's vote had been disrupted and said that the league had agreed to compromise. The quota provision was eliminated from the constitution, but a clause was added which committed the ANC to investigate and undertake affirmative action to correct gender imbalances. As the ANC concluded in its statement:

though the Women's League withdrew the resolution affecting 30% representation of Women in all ANC elective structures, the conference fully accepted the principle of affirmative action to ensure the equal and full participation of women in the movement as a whole, and stressed that appropriate mechanisms to make this effective be determined.

In the event, as reflected above, women were elected to fewer than a fifth of the NEC seats as elected later in the week, and no women were nominated for Top Six positions.

== Closing session ==
On 6 July, the plenary meet through much of the night, including in a session on sanctions led by Mbeki. The conference was closed by Mandela, the newly elected ANC president, at around 5.30 a.m. on Sunday 7 July; in his last address, he paid tribute to Tambo, whom he described as having:

paved the way forward with gold, the gold of his humanity, his warmth, his democratic spirit, tolerance and above all intellectual brilliance, which in the end outwitted the racists in this country. Of course, comrades, no struggle can depend on one person. The struggle is basically a collective affair. But there are exceptions to every rule, and looking at the history of the 30 last years of exile, one may be tempted to think that Comrade OR is that exception.

Delegates sang Nkosi Sikelel' Afrika in closing. The declaration adopted by the conference, "as our collective message to our country and to the world", reflects the hopefulness of the early transitional period in South Africa:

This 48th National Conference of the ANC, comes at a time when our country and its people are poised to commence the last leg of our long struggle to bring an end to minority domination and usher in an era of democracy and peace. The people's hopes for freedom, social justice, democracy and peace stand higher than at any time during this century. As a result of the struggles and sacrifices of the people, the moment for the final eradication of the hated system of white domination has dawned. We remain convinced that the only real hope for the future of our country and its people lies in the creation of a democratic society based on humane values. These values – government of the people, by the people and for the people – have been kept alive and survived in our country thanks to the sacrifices of millions of our people against the tyranny of white domination... We reiterate our adherence to the principles of a united, non-racial, non-sexist and democratic South Africa as enshrined in the Freedom Charter.
