= Rwanda–South Africa relations =

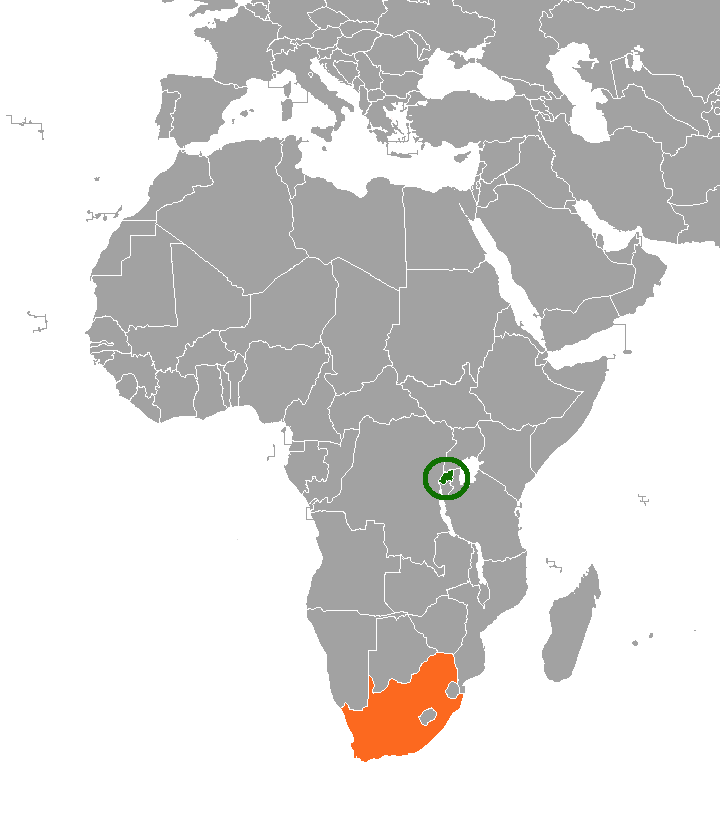
- Rwanda: South Africa

Envoy
- Ambassador M B M Mpahlwa: Ambassador E S Kayihura

Rwanda–South Africa relations are the bilateral relations between Rwanda and South Africa. Both countries are members of the African Union and the Commonwealth of Nations.

== History ==
Full diplomatic relations between the two countries was established in May 1995.

Rwanda and South Africa relations have faced periods of strain since 2013 when the former chief of intelligence for Rwanda, Patrick Karegeya, was assassinated whilst living in exile in South Africa. Relations were further strained in 2014 when the former Rwandan general Kayumba Nyamwasa was assassinated at a location near Johannesburg, South Africa. In South Africa both assassinations are believed to have been orchestrated by the Rwandan government. Prior to the assassinations Rwandan president Paul Kagame had accused South Africa of hosting "terrorists" that sought to oust him from power.

Since 2018 the two countries have sought to normalise relations. In a July 2021 report by Amnesty International it was alleged that the Rwandan government had engaged in espionage activity against South Africa president Cyril Ramaphosa by illegally installing Pegasus spyware on his mobile phone. In the same month Rwanda proposed coordinating operations with South Africa in efforts to combat the Islamist insurgency in Cabo Delgado.

During the 2025 Goma offensive 13 South African peacekeepers lost their lives in clashes with the Rwandan backed M23. South Africa's defence minister, Angie Motshekga, stated that the M23 offensive against South African positions was only alleviated after President Ramaphosa told the Rwandan government that continued attacks would be interpreted by South Africa as a "declaration of war" by Rwanda.

== Resident diplomatic missions ==
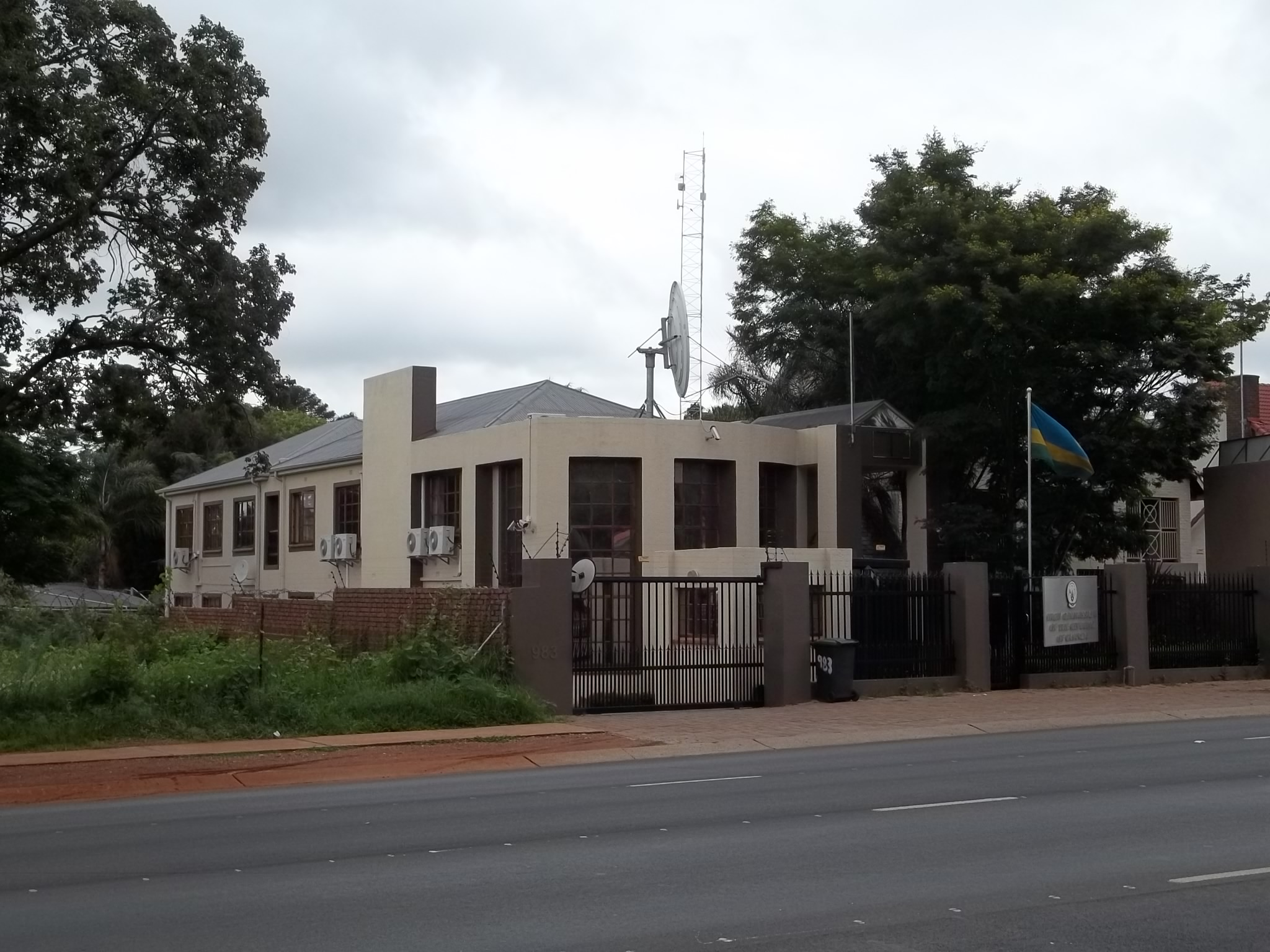
High Commission of Rwanda in Pretoria

- Rwanda has a high commission in Pretoria.
- South Africa has a high commission in Kigali.
