= Zenith University College =

Private higher-education institution in Ghana

Coordinates: 5.572717°N 0.14367°W

- Motto: Per Ardua Ad Astra
- Established: December 2001; 24 years ago
- Affiliations: University of Cape Coast
- Chairman: Prof Jophus Anamoah-Mensah, Chairman of Governing Council
- Chancellor: Gibrine Adam, Chancellor and Founder
- President: Gibrine Adam, President and Founder
- Vice-president: Mrs Margaret Andan, Vice President - Administration
- Rector: Stephen Takyi Asiedu
- Location: La, Accra, Ghana
- Website: www.zenithuniversitycollege.org

Zenith University College is a privately owned university in Ghana established in December 2001. At first Zenith was a tutorial college for some foreign universities. Zenith opened as a tertiary educational institution in November 2005, and was accredited to offer diploma, undergraduate and postgraduate programmes in Ghana.

In 2011, the Chartered Institute of Taxation, Ghana signed a memorandum of understanding with Zenith to provide tuition in taxation for students wanting to enter the profession.

== Programs ==
- Undergraduate
- Postgraduate
- Professional Courses
- Diploma Programs

== Undergraduate programs ==
- School of Business
- Faculty of Law
  - Ghana Law - accredited by National Accreditation Board - Ghana
  - London Law - accredited by the University of London - UK
- School of Computing and Information Technology

== Diploma Programs ==
- Diploma in Business Administration
- Diploma in Law

== Postgraduate Programs ==
- General Management
- Marketing
- Human Resource Management
- Banking and Finance

== Professional Courses ==
- Association of Business Executives (ABE)
- Confederation of Tourism and Hospitality (CTH)
- Chartered Institute of Logistics and Transport (CILT)
- Chartered Institute of Marketing (CIM)
- Association of Chartered Certified Accountants (ACCA)

== See also ==
- List of universities in Ghana
