= Cyril Ramaphosa =

President of South Africa since 2018

His Excellency Cyril Ramaphosa
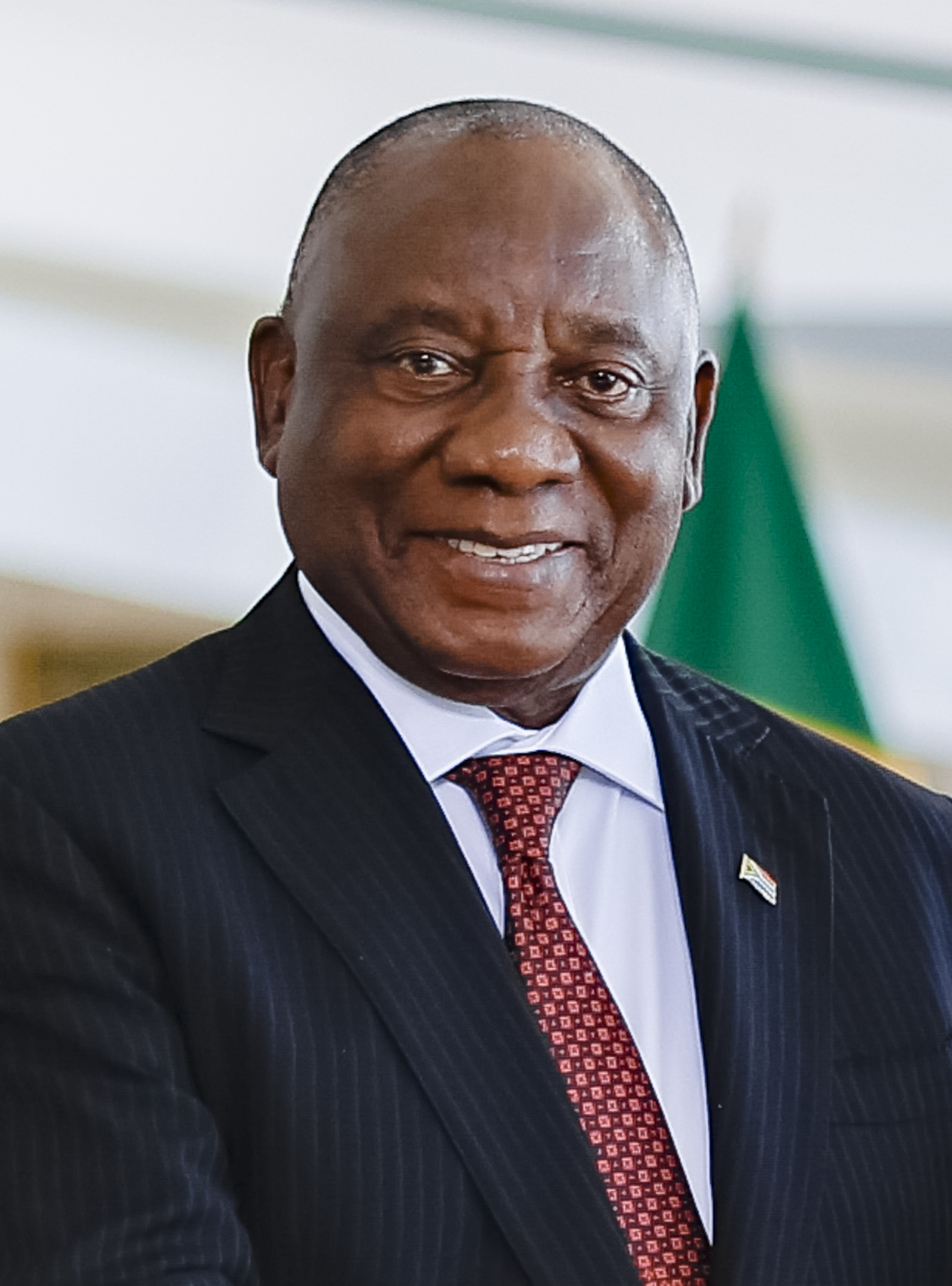
- Ramaphosa in 2026

5th President of South Africa
- Incumbent
- Assumed office 15 February 2018 (Note: Acting 14 February – 15 February 2018.)
- Deputy: David Mabuza (2018–2023); Paul Mashatile (since 2023)
- Preceded by: Jacob Zuma

President of the African National Congress
- Incumbent
- Assumed office 18 December 2017
- Deputy: David Mabuza (2017–2022); Paul Mashatile (since 2022)
- Preceded by: Jacob Zuma

Deputy President of South Africa
- In office 26 May 2014 – 15 February 2018
- President: Jacob Zuma
- Preceded by: Kgalema Motlanthe
- Succeeded by: David Mabuza

Deputy President of the African National Congress
- In office 18 December 2012 – 18 December 2017
- President: Jacob Zuma
- Preceded by: Kgalema Motlanthe
- Succeeded by: David Mabuza

Secretary-General of the African National Congress
- In office 7 July 1991 – December 1996
- President: Nelson Mandela
- Preceded by: Alfred Nzo
- Succeeded by: Cheryl Carolus (acting); Kgalema Motlanthe

Member of the National Assembly
- In office 9 May 1994 – December 1996
Additional offices 1982‍–‍2021
Chairperson of the African Union
In office 10 February 2020 – 6 February 2021
Preceded by	Abdel Fattah el-Sisi
Succeeded by	Felix Tshisekedi
Chancellor of the University of Mpumalanga
In office 2 April 2016 – 1 July 2021
Vice-Chancellor	Thoko Mayekiso
Preceded by	Position established
Succeeded by	Mandisa Maya
Secretary-General of the National Union of Mineworkers
In office August 1982 – June 1991
President	James Motlatsi
Preceded by	Position established
Succeeded by	Kgalema Motlanthe

Personal details
- Born: Matamela Cyril Ramaphosa; 17 November 1952 (age 74) Soweto, Union of South Africa
- Party: African National Congress
- Spouses: Hope Ramaphosa (m. 1978; div. 1989) Nomazizi Mtshotshisa (m. 1991; div. 1993) Tshepo Motsepe (m. 1996)
- Children: 5 (estimated)
- Education: University of the North; University of South Africa
- Occupation: Politician; businessman; lawyer; trade unionist; philanthropist; activist
- Website: Foundation website; Presidency website

Matamela Cyril Ramaphosa (Note: /ˌræməˈfɔːsə/ RAM-ə-FAW-sə or /ˌrɑːməˈpoʊsə/ RAH-mə-POH-sə) (born 17 November 1952) is a South African businessman and politician who is serving as the fifth president of South Africa since 2018. A former anti-apartheid activist and trade union leader, Ramaphosa is also the president of the African National Congress (ANC).

Ramaphosa rose to national prominence as secretary general of South Africa's biggest and most powerful trade union, the National Union of Mineworkers. In 1991, he was elected ANC secretary general under ANC president Nelson Mandela and became the ANC's chief negotiator during the negotiations that ended apartheid. He was elected chairperson of the Constitutional Assembly after the country's first fully democratic elections in 1994 and some observers believed that he was Mandela's preferred successor. However, Ramaphosa resigned from politics in 1996 and became well known as a businessman, including as an owner of McDonald's South Africa, chair of the board for MTN, member of the board for Lonmin, and founder of the Shanduka Group.

Ramaphosa returned to politics in December 2012 at the ANC's 53rd National Conference and served as the deputy president of South Africa under President Jacob Zuma from 2014 to 2018. He was also chairman of the National Planning Commission. At the ANC's 54th National Conference on 18 December 2017, he was elected president of the ANC. Two months later, the day after Zuma resigned on 14 February 2018, the National Assembly (NA) elected Ramaphosa as president of South Africa. He began his first full term as president in May 2019 following the ANC's victory in the 2019 general election. While president, Ramaphosa served as chairperson of the African Union from 2020 to 2021 and led South Africa's response to the COVID-19 pandemic.

Ramaphosa's net worth was estimated at over R6.4 billion ($450 million) as of 2018. He has been criticised for his conduct and involvement in his business interests, including his harsh posture as a Lonmin director towards the Marikana miners' strike in the week ahead of the Marikana massacre.

On 19 December 2022, it was announced that the ANC's 55th National Conference had elected Ramaphosa to a second term as president of the ANC. On 14 June 2024, the National Assembly of South Africa elected Ramaphosa to a second term as president of South Africa after the ANC lost its majority in the general election.

== Early life ==
Ramaphosa was born in Soweto, Johannesburg, on 17 November 1952, to Venda parents. He is the second of the three children to Erdmuth and retired policeman Samuel Ramaphosa. He attended Tshilidzi Primary School and Sekano Ntoane High School in Soweto. In 1971, he matriculated from Mphaphuli High School in Sibasa, Venda where he was elected head of the Student Christian Movement. He subsequently registered to study law at the University of the North (Turfloop) in northern Transvaal Province (now Limpopo Province) in 1972.

While at university, Ramaphosa became involved in student politics and joined the South African Students' Organisation (SASO) and the Black People's Convention (BPC). This resulted in him being detained in solitary confinement for eleven months in 1974 under Section 6 of the Terrorism Act, 1967, for organising pro-Frelimo rallies. In 1976 he was detained again, following the unrest in Soweto, and held for six months at John Vorster Square under the Terrorism Act. After his release, he became a law clerk for a Johannesburg firm of attorneys and continued with his legal studies through correspondence with the University of South Africa (UNISA), where he obtained his Bachelor of Procurationis degree (B. Proc.) in 1981.

== Anti-apartheid and labour activism ==
After completing his legal qualifications and obtaining his degree, Ramaphosa joined the Council of Unions of South Africa (CUSA) as an advisor in the legal department. In 1982, CUSA requested that Ramaphosa start a union for mineworkers; this new union was launched in the same year and was named the National Union of Mineworkers (NUM). Ramaphosa was arrested in Lebowa, on the charge of organising or planning to take part in a meeting in Namakgale which had been banned by the local magistrate.

In August 1982, CUSA resolved to form the National Union of Mineworkers (NUM), and in December Ramaphosa became its first secretary. Ramaphosa was the conference organiser in the preparations leading to the formation of the Congress of South African Trade Unions (COSATU). He delivered a keynote address at Cosatu's launch rally in Durban in December 1985. In March 1986, he was part of COSATU's delegation which met the African National Congress in Lusaka, Zambia.

Ramaphosa was elected as the first general secretary of the union, a position he held until he resigned in June 1991, following his election as secretary-general of the African National Congress (ANC). Under his leadership, union membership grew from 6,000 in 1982 to 300,000 in 1992, giving it control of nearly half of the total black workforce in the South African mining industry. As general secretary, he, James Motlatsi (president of NUM), and Elijah Barayi (vice-president of NUM) also led the mineworkers in one of the biggest strikes ever in South African history.

In December 1988, Ramaphosa and other prominent members of the Soweto community met Soweto's mayor to discuss the rent boycott crisis.

In 1985, the NUM broke away from CUSA and helped to establish the Congress of South African Trade Unions (COSATU). When COSATU joined forces with the United Democratic Front (UDF) political movement against the National Party government of P. W. Botha, Ramaphosa took a leading role in what became known as the Mass Democratic Movement (MDM).

Ramaphosa has claimed that he is a committed socialist.

== Rise in the ANC (1990–1996) ==
After the ANC was unbanned in early 1990, Ramaphosa became increasingly close with the organisation. In January 1990, he accompanied released ANC political prisoners to the ANC headquarters in Lusaka, Zambia; and, later, that year, he served as chairman of the National Reception Committee, which coordinated arrangements for Nelson Mandela's release from prison, including concomitant celebratory rallies. Ramaphosa was elected Secretary-General of the ANC at the party's 48th National Conference in Durban in July 1991, and subsequently became head of the ANC's delegation to the negotiations that ended apartheid. He was also a visiting professor of law at Stanford University in October 1991.

Following the first fully democratic elections in 1994, he became a Member of Parliament (MP) and was elected the chairperson of its Constitutional Assembly on 24 May 1994, a central role in Mandela's Government of National Unity. He was also re-elected, unopposed, as ANC Secretary-General at the party's 49th National Conference in December 1994. However, in 1996, he resigned from ANC office and from Parliament and announced his retreat from politics, reportedly because he was disappointed that Thabo Mbeki had been anointed Mandela's successor.

== Business career (1996–2014) ==
After he resigned from politics, Ramaphosa became a businessman, taking advantage of the conducive environment provided by the new Black Economic Empowerment (BEE) policy. Among other positions, he was executive chairman of the Shanduka Group, a company he founded, which invested in mineral resources, energy, real estate, banking, insurance, and telecoms (SEACOM). By 2014, Shanduka was worth more than R20-billion, and the Ramaphosa family's Tshivhase Trust was its majority shareholder. Ramaphosa was also a chairman of Bidvest, MTN, and from March 2007, Mondi, a leading international paper and packaging group. His other non-executive directorships included Macsteel Holdings, Alexander Forbes, SABMiller, Lonmin, Anglo American, and Standard Bank. In 2011, Ramaphosa paid for a 20-year master franchise agreement to run 145 McDonald's restaurants in South Africa. He also belonged to the Coca-Cola Company International Advisory Board and the Unilever Africa Advisory Council.

Ramaphosa's various shareholdings made him one of South Africa's richest men. According to the Sunday Times, his estimated net worth of R2.22 billion made him the 13th richest person in South Africa in 2011, and that figure jumped to R3.1 billion in 2012. Both estimates, moreover, excluded his unlisted investments through Shanduka, including the McDonald's franchise agreement and a coal-mining partnership with Glencore.

=== Cattle farming ===
During a visit to Uganda in 2004, Ramaphosa became interested in the Ankole breed of cattle. Because of inadequate disease control measures in Uganda, the South African government denied him permission to import any of the breed. Instead, Ramaphosa purchased 43 cows from Ugandan president Yoweri Museveni and shipped them to Kenya, where they were artificially inseminated; the embryos were then removed and shipped to South Africa, to be transferred to quarantined cows. As of August 2017, Ramaphosa had 100 Ankole breeding cows at his Ntaba Nyoni farm in Mpumalanga. That year, he co-wrote a book about the breed, Cattle of the Ages: Stories, and Portraits of the Ankole Cattle of Southern Africa.

=== Public service ===
His resignation from politics notwithstanding, Ramaphosa occasionally accepted positions in the public eye, both abroad and in South Africa. He became the first Vice Chairman of the Commonwealth Business Council, and, in 1998, the Chairman of South Africa's BEE Commission. In 2000, he was appointed to the Independent International Commission on Decommissioning as an arms inspector, responsible for supervising the decommissioning of Irish Republican Army armaments in Northern Ireland. And, in April 2010, he was appointed by President Jacob Zuma to the National Planning Commission, where he served as deputy chairperson to Minister in the Presidency Trevor Manuel.

In the 2007–2008 Kenyan crisis, which followed the disputed re-election of President Mwai Kibaki in December 2007, Ramaphosa was unanimously chosen by Kofi Annan's mediation team to be the chief mediator in charge of long-term talks. However, Kibaki's government protested Ramaphosa's involvement, saying that he had business links with Kibaki's opponent Raila Odinga. According to Ramaphosa, Odinga had visited him in 2007, but he did not have any "special interest" that would lead him to favour one side or the other; however, he said that he could not be an effective mediator without "the trust and confidence of all parties" and that he did not wish to become an obstacle to the negotiations. He therefore withdrew from the talks on 4 February. However, he returned to a peacemaking role in 2014, when – in his capacity as Deputy Chairperson of the National Planning Commission – he served as the South African President's Special Envoy to South Sudan during the South Sudanese civil war.

Ramaphosa also continued to accept nominations to the National Executive Committee of the ANC: at the 50th National Conference in 1997, he received the most votes of any candidate; and at the 51st National Conference in 2002, he received the second-most. Ahead of the 52nd National Conference in 2007, he denied persistent rumours that he intended to join the race to replace Mbeki as ANC president; that year, he ranked 30th on the list of most popular NEC candidates.

== ANC Deputy Presidency (2012–2017) ==
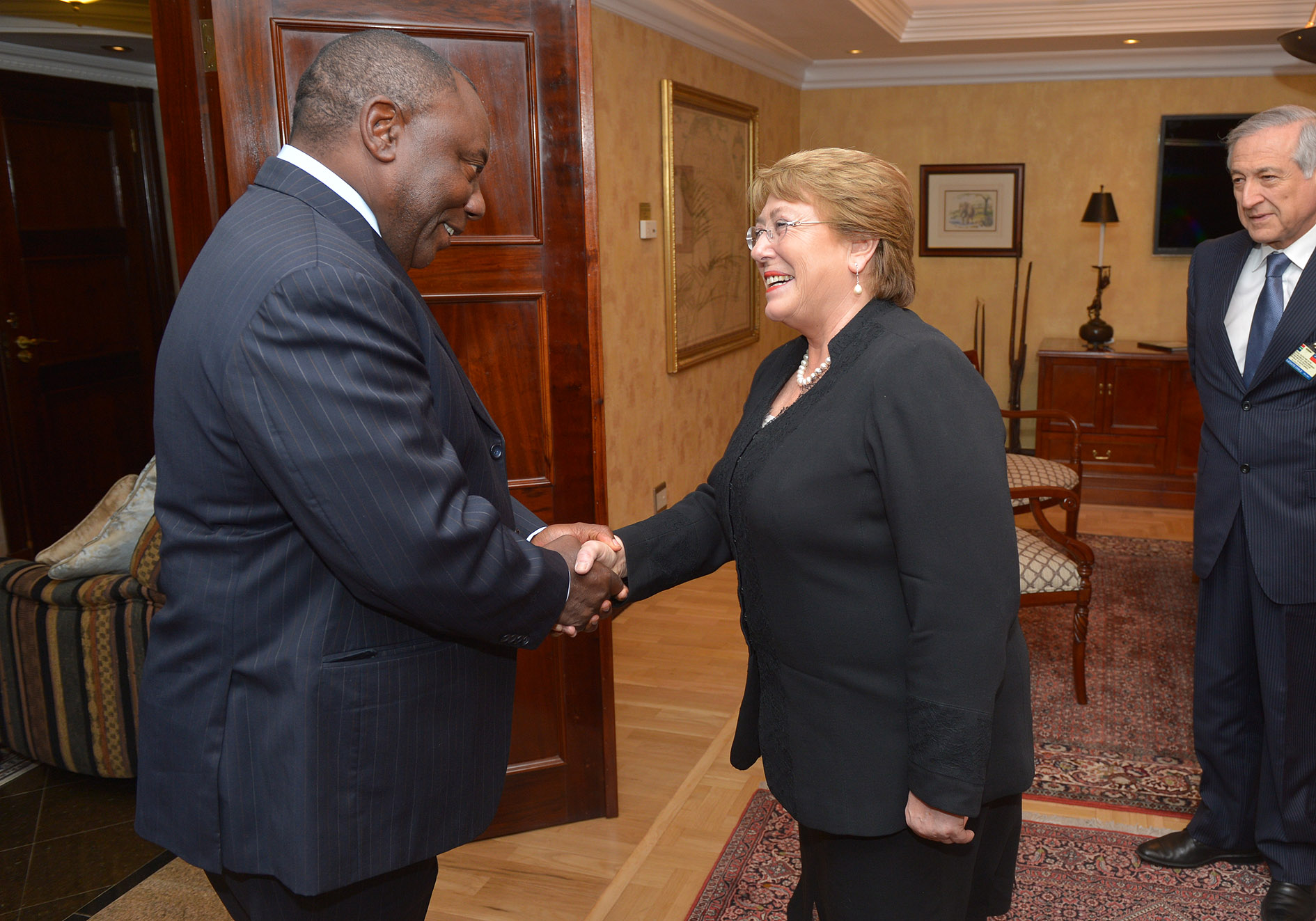
Ramaphosa meets with Chilean President Michelle Bachelet in Santiago, 8 August 2014.

Ramaphosa made his return to political leadership in 2012, ahead of the ANC's 53rd National Conference, when he received nominations to become ANC Deputy President. On 20 May 2012, Derek Hanekom, an ANC MP, publicly encouraged Ramaphosa to run for the ANC presidency, saying, "We need leaders of comrade Cyril's calibre. I know Cyril is very good at business, but I really wish he would put all his money in a trust and step up for a higher and more senior position". Ramaphosa dismissed the resulting speculation, saying, "You can't read anything [into what Hanekom said]. He was joking".

Indeed, Ramaphosa did not confirm his intention to accept the deputy presidential nomination until 16 December, the day before the conference began. However, he received strong backing from incumbent President Jacob Zuma – a partnership viewed as a strategic attempt by Zuma to "outsmart and punish" Kgalema Motlanthe, who was challenging Zuma for the presidency but whose constituency was similar to Ramaphosa's, given their shared union backgrounds and polished reputations. Ramaphosa elected ANC Deputy President in a resounding victory on 18 December: he received 3,018 votes, while Mathews Phosa received 470 votes and Tokyo Sexwale received 463 votes.

== Deputy Presidency of South Africa (2014–2018) ==
After his reelection in the 2014 elections, President Zuma appointed Ramaphosa the Deputy President of South Africa on 25 May 2014; Ramaphosa was sworn into office by Chief Justice Mogoeng Mogoeng the following day.

After his election as ANC Deputy President, Ramaphosa had begun the process of resigning from various business positions, and in 2014 he concluded the process, as required by the Executive Ethics Code. This entailed his exit from Shanduka, from McDonald's South Africa, from platinum producer Lonmin, and from all other companies which might give rise to a conflict of interest, particularly in industries regulated by the government. His other interests – including a share trading company, his livestock farms, his property interests, and a sports car company – were placed in a blind trust. Parliament's 2014 Register of Members' Interests reflected over R76-million in company shares held by Ramaphosa (although that figure excluded shares held together with private individuals), as well as his ownership of 30 townhouses in Johannesburg and two apartments in Cape Town.

=== Domestic role ===
Alongside his duties as Deputy President, Ramaphosa was made Leader of Government Business in the National Assembly in terms of section 91(4) of the Constitution, a role which involved coordinating between Parliament and Zuma's cabinet. On 3 June, Zuma also appointed him the Chairman of the National Planning Commission, with Jeff Radebe as his deputy. In addition, Ramaphosa was responsible for developing a proposal to implement a national minimum wage, leading consultation on the matter between Zuma's administration and representatives of labour and business. The proposal was approved by cabinet in November 2017.

In July 2014, Ramaphosa called for unity in the country after Julius Malema argued that the Afrikaans portion of the national anthem should be scrapped. Ramaphosa said, "We are about building a nation and we must extend a hand of friendship, a hand of continued reconciliation to those who feel that the national anthem does not represent them any longer, and it can happen on both sides". Late in Zuma's term, Ramaphosa also began to address publicly the widespread allegations of corruption in Zuma's administration.

=== Foreign relations ===
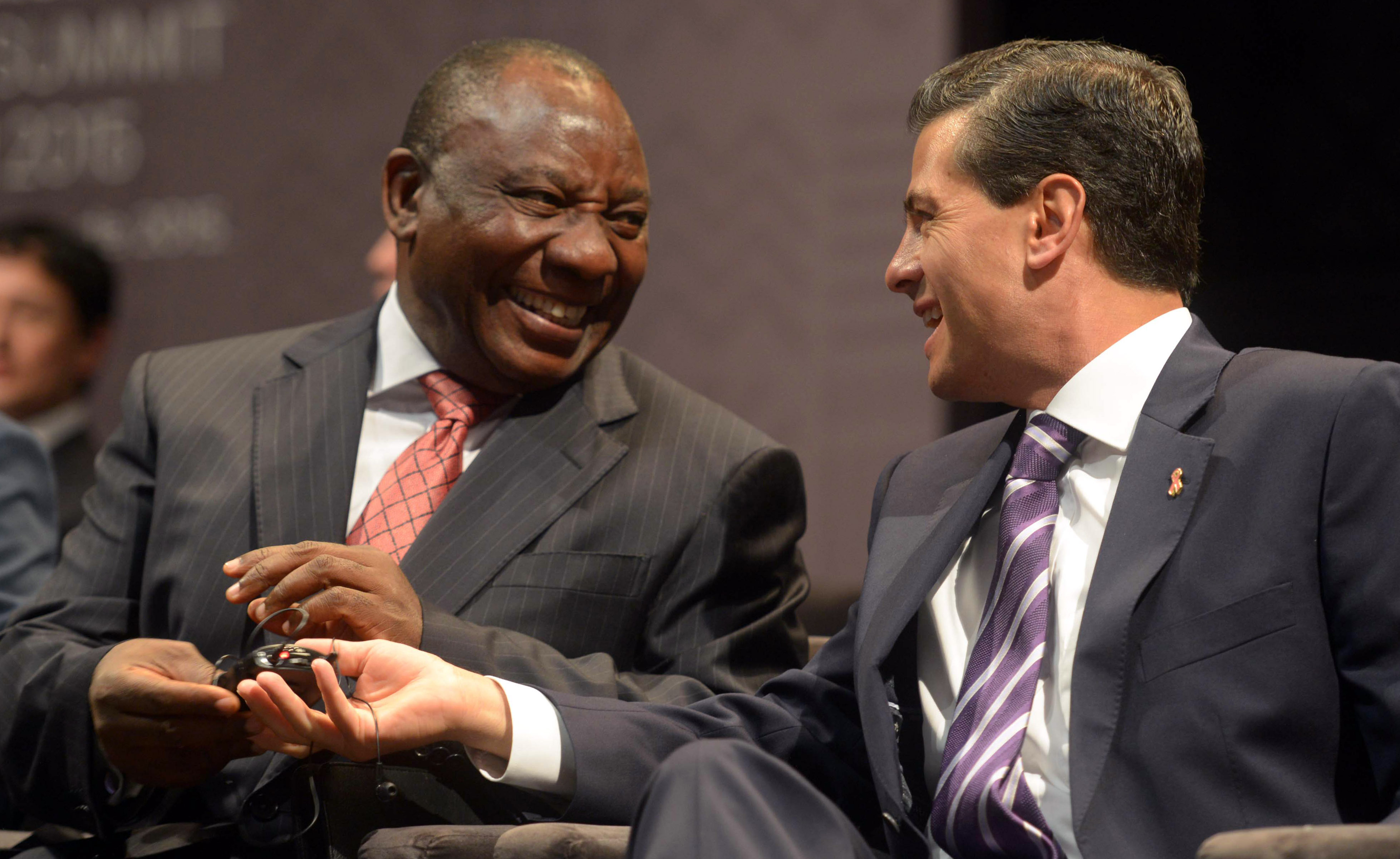
Ramaphosa at the Global Open Government Summit in Mexico City, 28 October 2015

In 2018, Ramaphosa, in Zuma's stead, led South Africa's delegation to the World Economic Forum in Davos, to promote investment and business in South Africa. His other official trips abroad included a two-day working visit to Vietnam and Singapore, the objectives of which included consolidating trade relations, as well as the opportunity for South Africa to learn from the Singaporean economic model and the role it prescribed for state-owned enterprises. Ramaphosa also continued to serve as Zuma's Special Envoy during the mediation in the South Sudanese conflict, and participated in the Southern African Development Community (SADC) mediation in neighbouring Lesotho.

== ANC Presidency (2017–present) ==
=== Election ===
Ramaphosa stood for the ANC presidency in 2017, at the expiry of Zuma's term. Although he received the NUM's endorsement as early as September 2016, his campaign did not begin until April 2017. Under the banner #CR17 Siyavuma, Ramaphosa ran on anti-corruption platform, with an emphasis on economic policies conducive to industrialisation and investment. He was endorsed by Cosatu and the SACP; by the provincial leadership of the ANC's Northern Cape, Eastern Cape, and Gauteng provinces; and by politicians including education minister Angie Motshekga, former finance minister Pravin Gordhan, Cosatu president Sdumo Dlamini, and former KwaZulu-Natal Premier Senzo Mchunu.

Ramaphosa's primary opponent was Nkosazana Dlamini-Zuma, who had the endorsement of Zuma, her ex-husband. On 18 December 2017, he was elected the President of the ANC at the party's 54th National Conference, defeating Dlamini-Zuma by 2,440 votes to 2,261.

=== Renewal project ===
In his first speech as ANC leader, Ramaphosa pledged to stamp out corruption in the party. He subsequently spearheaded what he said was a campaign to "renew" the ANC internally and to restore its integrity and public image. Among other things, this campaign entailed the implementation of the new step-aside rule to suspend ANC leaders accused of corruption. This, in turn, led to a confrontation with ANC Secretary-General Ace Magashule, who, upon his suspension from the party in May 2021, attempted to retaliate by suspending Ramaphosa, accusing him of irregularities in the financing of the CR2017 campaign. Magashule's attempt had no legal force because of his own suspension.

In December 2022, Ramaphosa was re-elected leader of the ANC, running against Zweli Mkhize, for a second five-year term.

== Presidency of South Africa (2018–present) ==
Following President Jacob Zuma's resignation in February 2018, Ramaphosa was elected unopposed as President of South Africa by the National Assembly on 15 February 2018. Ramaphosa took his oath of office in the presidential guesthouse, Tuynhuys, by Chief Justice Mogoeng Mogoeng.

Markets rallied strongly the day after Ramaphosa assumed the presidency with stocks rising and the rand reaching its firmest since early 2015. Government bonds also increased in strength.

On 16 February 2018, Ramaphosa gave his first State of the Nation Address as the president of South Africa, the first time in a democratic South Africa where the president delivered his State of the Nation Address without a deputy president. Ramaphosa emphasised the need to grow the economy of South Africa, increase tourism and youth employment, as well as reduce the size of the Cabinet. In this speech, Ramaphosa also focused on the importance of keeping Mandela's legacy alive.

Ramaphosa's speech was met with mostly positive reviews from opposition parties saying that his speech was positive and that it would bring about change, but that they would hold him accountable.

On 17 February 2018, Ramaphosa, as commander in chief of the South African National Defence Force, attended the Armed Forces Inter-Faith Service at the Mittah Seperepere Convention Centre in Kimberley and made his first public speech as the president of South Africa.

On 26 February 2018, Ramaphosa, who had inherited Jacob Zuma's cabinet, reshuffled cabinet for the first time removing many of the cabinet members who had been controversial through the Zuma era and who had close links to the Gupta family. Ramaphosa also named the deputy president of the African National Congress and the Premier of Mpumalanga, David Mabuza, as the country's Deputy President.

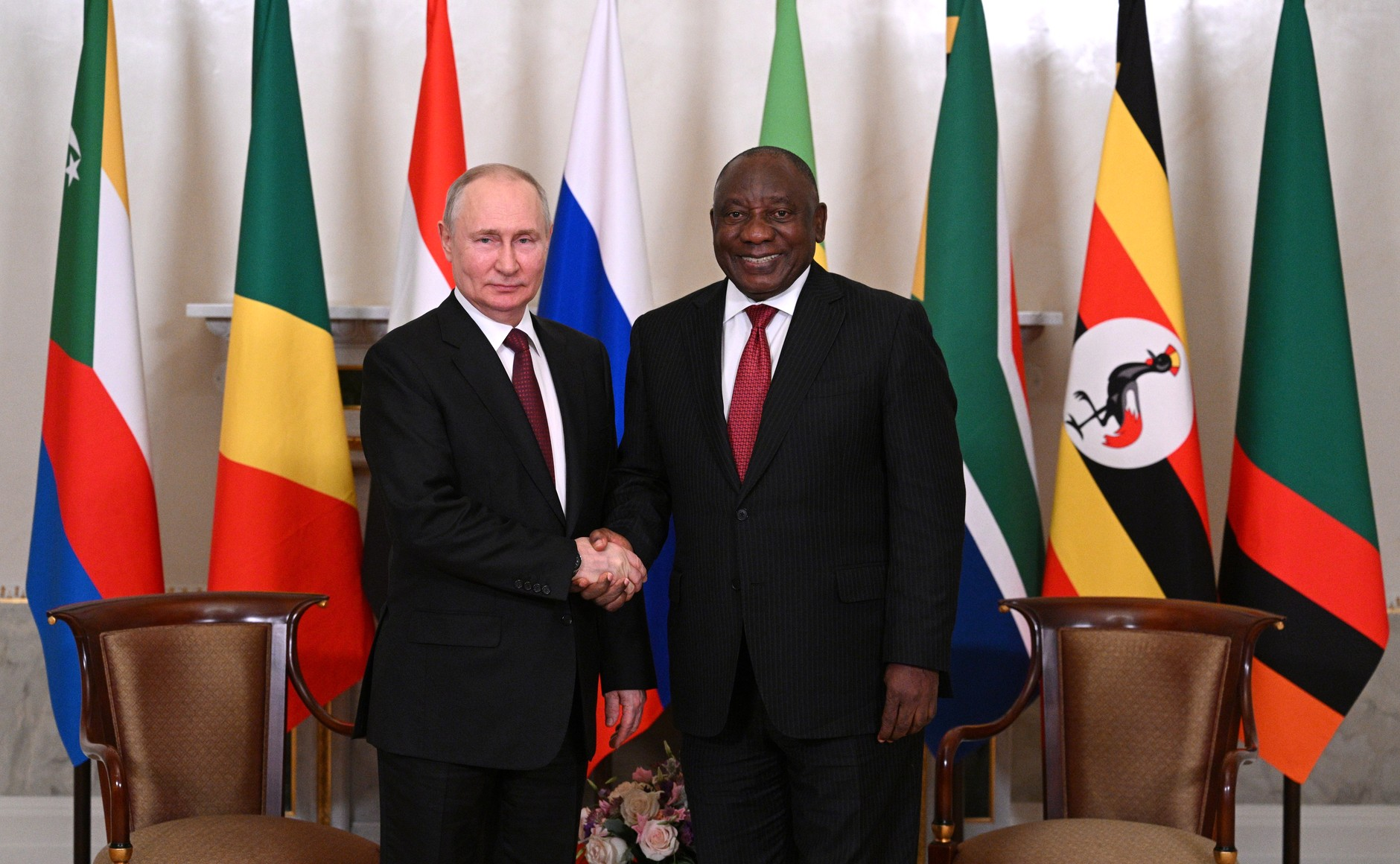
Ramaphosa with Russian President Vladimir Putin in St. Petersburg on 17 June 2023

On 8 May 2019, the African National Congress led by President Ramaphosa won 57.50% of the vote in the 2019 South African general election. Ramaphosa was subsequently elected unopposed to his first full term as president by the National Assembly on 22 May 2019. As Ramaphosa had previously been elected as president to fill the vacancy left by the resignation of his predecessor, he is constitutionally eligible to serve two full terms.

At the 2020 AU summit, Ramaphosa expressed support for the African Continental Free Trade Area and described it as a major driver for reigniting industrialization and paving the way for Africa's integration into the global market. Ramaphosa also stated that the free trade agreement will make Africa a player of considerable weight and scale in the global market as well.

At the 2020 AU Summit, Ramaphosa also expressed support for closing the gender gap and ending gender inequality.

His government responded to the 2021 South African unrest, the deadliest riots in South Africa since the apartheid era.

Ramaphosa was re-elected as president for a second term on 14 June 2024 with the support of the Democratic Alliance and other opposition parties after ANC failed to win an outright majority in the 2024 general elections. Ramaphosa was inaugurated and took his oath of office at the Union Buildings in Pretoria on 19 June 2024.

=== Domestic policy ===
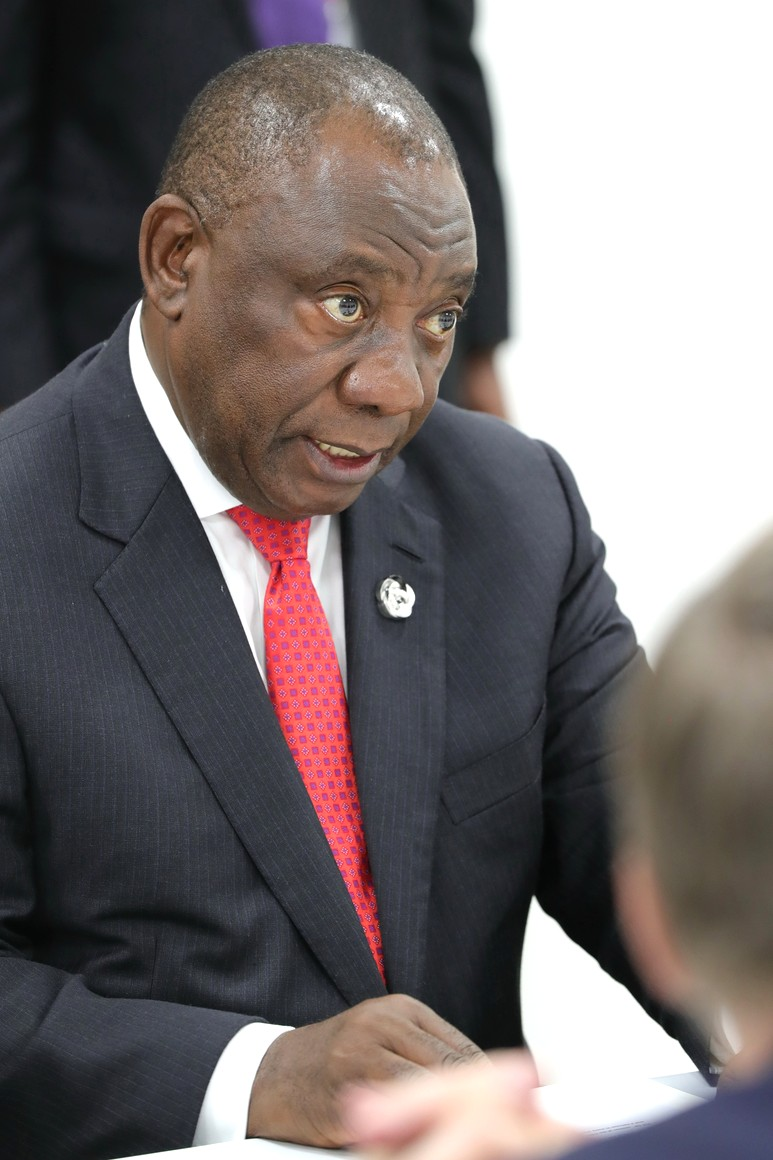
Ramaphosa in 2019

Since Ramaphosa became president he has made land reform and the economy his main priorities, as well as dealing with the outbreak of listeriosis which has claimed the lives of over 100 since the start of 2018.

In February 2018, South Africa's parliament voted 241–83 to begin amending the "property clause" in the constitution to allow the expropriation of land without compensation.

On 19 March 2018, Ramaphosa suspended Tom Moyane as the Commissioner of the South African Revenue Service after Moyane had refused to step down.

He signed the Expropriation Act, 2024 into law which allows the government to expropriate land without compensation through a court process in the public interest. He has said that the policy would encourage economic growth.

On 14 August 2018, Ramaphosa appointed Dr. Silas Ramaite as the Acting National Director of Public Prosecutions (NDPP) following the ruling by the Constitutional Court that Director Shaun Abrahams had been appointed unlawfully by the former president, Jacob Zuma.

South Africa made world headlines because of attacks against foreign nationals within the borders of the country, with many South Africans blaming foreign nationals for the country's socio-economic issues.

On 10 June 2021, Ramaphosa announced that his government would raise the threshold for the amount of electricity that private companies could produce without a license – from 1 Megawatt to 100 Megawatts. The decision was taken in order to respond to the increasing challenges faced by the country during the ongoing energy crisis, and to give "oomph," in Ramaphosa's words, to South Africa's economic recovery.

On 11 February 2022, Ramaphosa announced that his government will formalise the South African cannabis industry, seeking to grow both production and exports.

Ramaphosa launched the Youth Employment Service (YES) initiative as a means to employ one million youth and giving them more experience in the working field, with the South African Government even introducing the Employment Tax Incentive, which would reduce employer's costs when hiring youth.

On 14 August 2018, President Ramaphosa addressed the launch of the Sanitation Appropriate For Education (SAFE) initiative in Pretoria to respond to the sanitary challenges facing the country's poorest schools.

=== Foreign policy ===
Map showing a summary of the countries Ramaphosa made official trips as president

Ramaphosa made his first international trip as the president of South Africa on 2 March 2018 to the Republic of Angola and met with President João Lourenço as the chair of the Southern African Development Community (SADC).

On 20 March 2018, Ramaphosa made a trip to Kigali, Rwanda, along with Foreign Minister Lindiwe Sisulu, and met with President Paul Kagame and spoke about restoring relations between South Africa and Rwanda, later participating as panelists on the African Continental Free Trade Area Business Forum (ACFTABF) ahead of the 10th African Union Extraordinary Summit. The following day, Ramaphosa signed the Kigali Declaration on the establishment of the ACFTABF at the 10th African Union Extraordinary Summit.

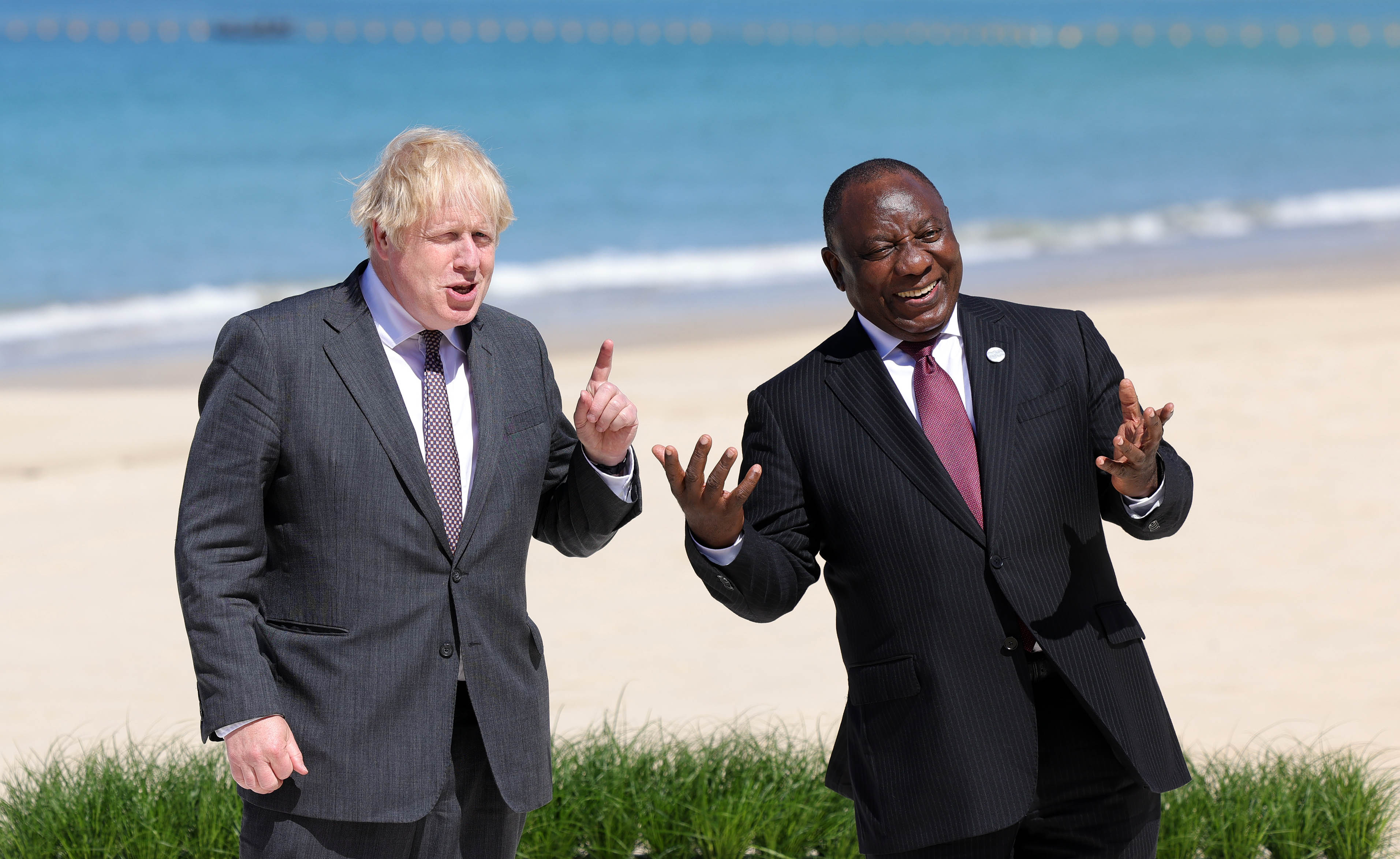
Ramaphosa alongside UK Prime Minister Boris Johnson at the 47th G7 summit, 12 June 2021

Ramaphosa hosted the 11th BRICS summit for 25–27 July 2018, at the Sandton Convention Centre in Johannesburg.

On 10 May 2021, Ramaphosa said that the ANC condemned "in the strongest possible terms" the potential evictions of Palestinian families from their homes in Israeli-occupied East Jerusalem and the "brutal attacks on Palestinian protesters" at Al-Aqsa.

Following the Russian invasion of Ukraine, launched on 24 February 2022, Ramaphosa did not condemn Russia or agree to any sanctions against Russia. A month later, he stated that maintaining neutrality was essential to his having been asked to mediate between the two countries' leadership. Ramaphosa blamed NATO's proximity to Russian borders for the war: "The war could have been avoided if NATO had heeded the warnings from amongst its own leaders and officials over the years that its eastward expansion would lead to greater, not less, instability in the region." On 11 May 2023, the United States ambassador to South Africa alleged the country was supplying weapons and ammunition to Russia. Days later, Ramaphosa announced his Russian and Ukrainian counterparts have agreed that a delegation of African heads of state could visit Moscow and Kyiv to present a peace plan. "Whether that will succeed or not is going to depend on the discussions that will be held," he said.

In November 2022, Ramaphosa became the first foreign head of state to make a formal state visit to the United Kingdom during the reign of King Charles III. He was made an honorary Knight Grand Cross of the Order of the Bath by Charles.

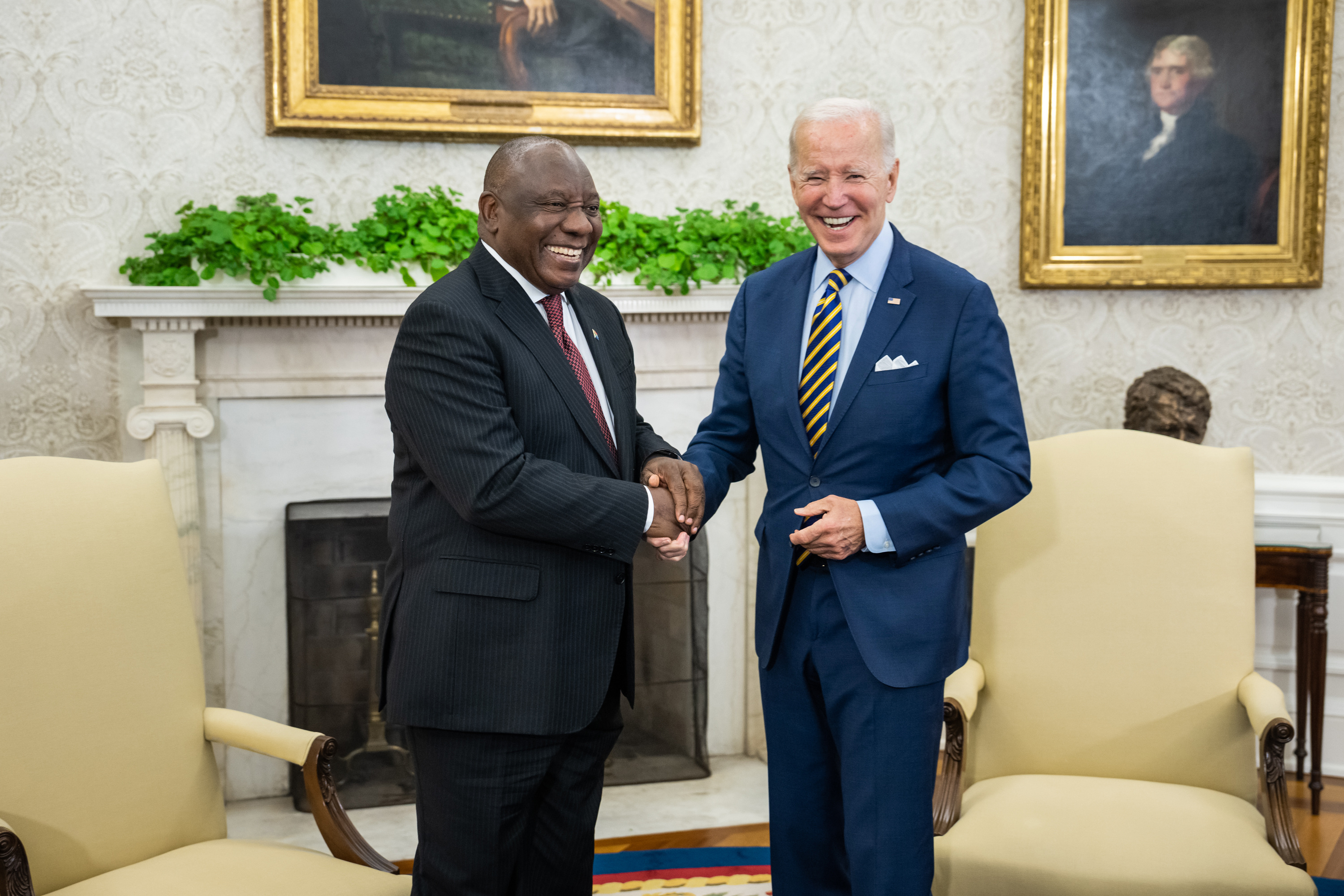
Ramaphosa with U.S. President Joe Biden in the White House, 16 September 2022

On 16 May 2023, Ramaphosa announced that the leaders of African countries came up with a new initiative for peace in Ukraine. In June 2023, Ramaphosa led a delegation to Russia and Ukraine, which also included heads of state from Zambia, the Republic of Congo, Egypt, Uganda and Senegal. After a meeting with Ramaphosa in Kyiv, Ukrainian President Volodymyr Zelenskyy said that peace talks with Russia would be possible only after Moscow withdraws its forces from the entire occupied territory. Ramaphosa visited the site of a mass grave in the town of Bucha, Ukraine and was in Kyiv during Russia's missile attack on the city. Putin later admitted to Ramaphosa that he had ordered the bombing of Kyiv that day despite the presence of an African delegation in the city. He met Russian President Vladimir Putin in St. Petersburg and told Putin that the war must end, but Putin rejected the delegation's peace plan based on accepting Ukraine's internationally recognized borders.

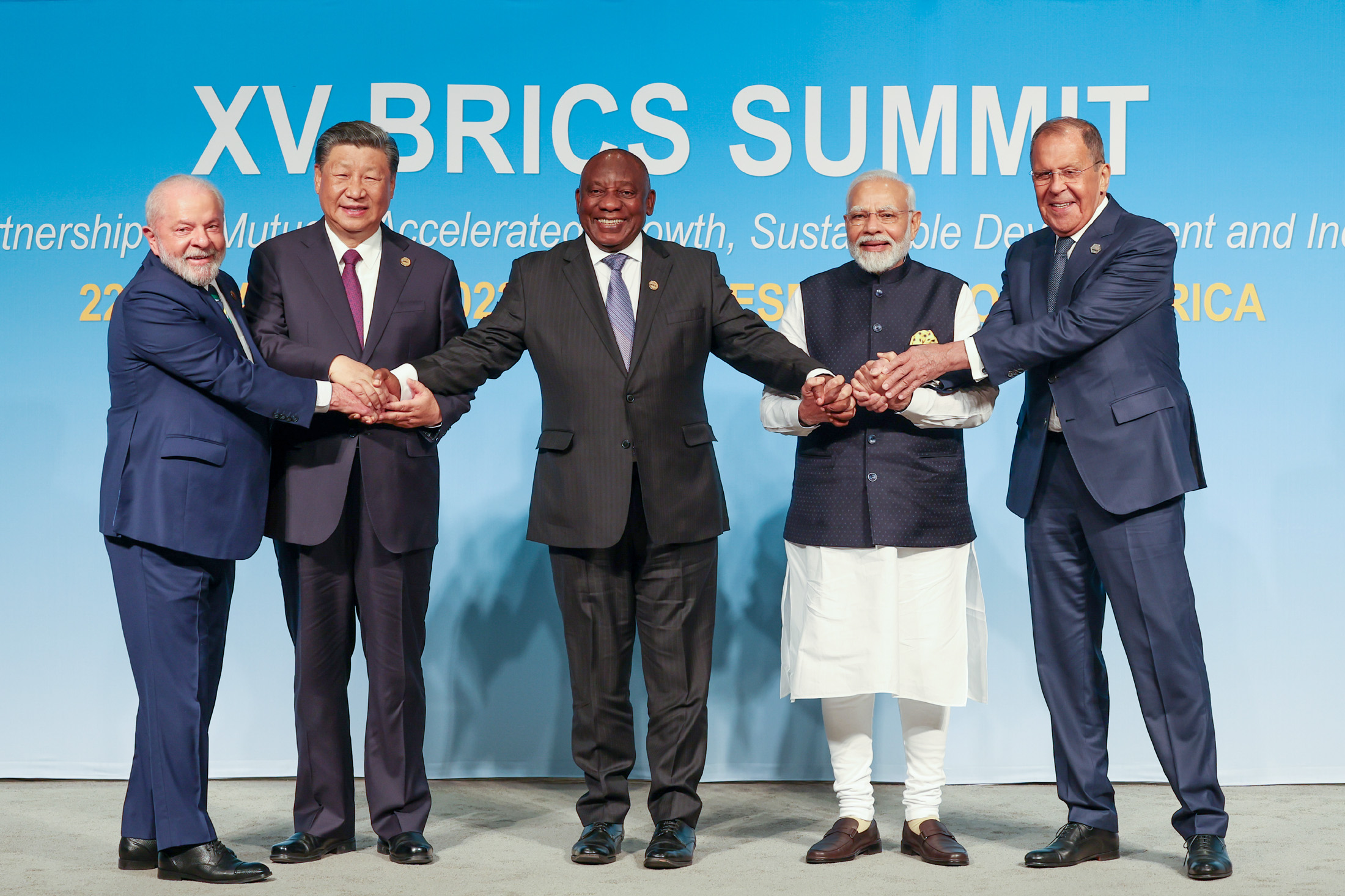
Ramaphosa and other BRICS leaders during the 15th BRICS Summit in Johannesburg, August 2023. Russia was represented by Foreign Minister Sergey Lavrov.

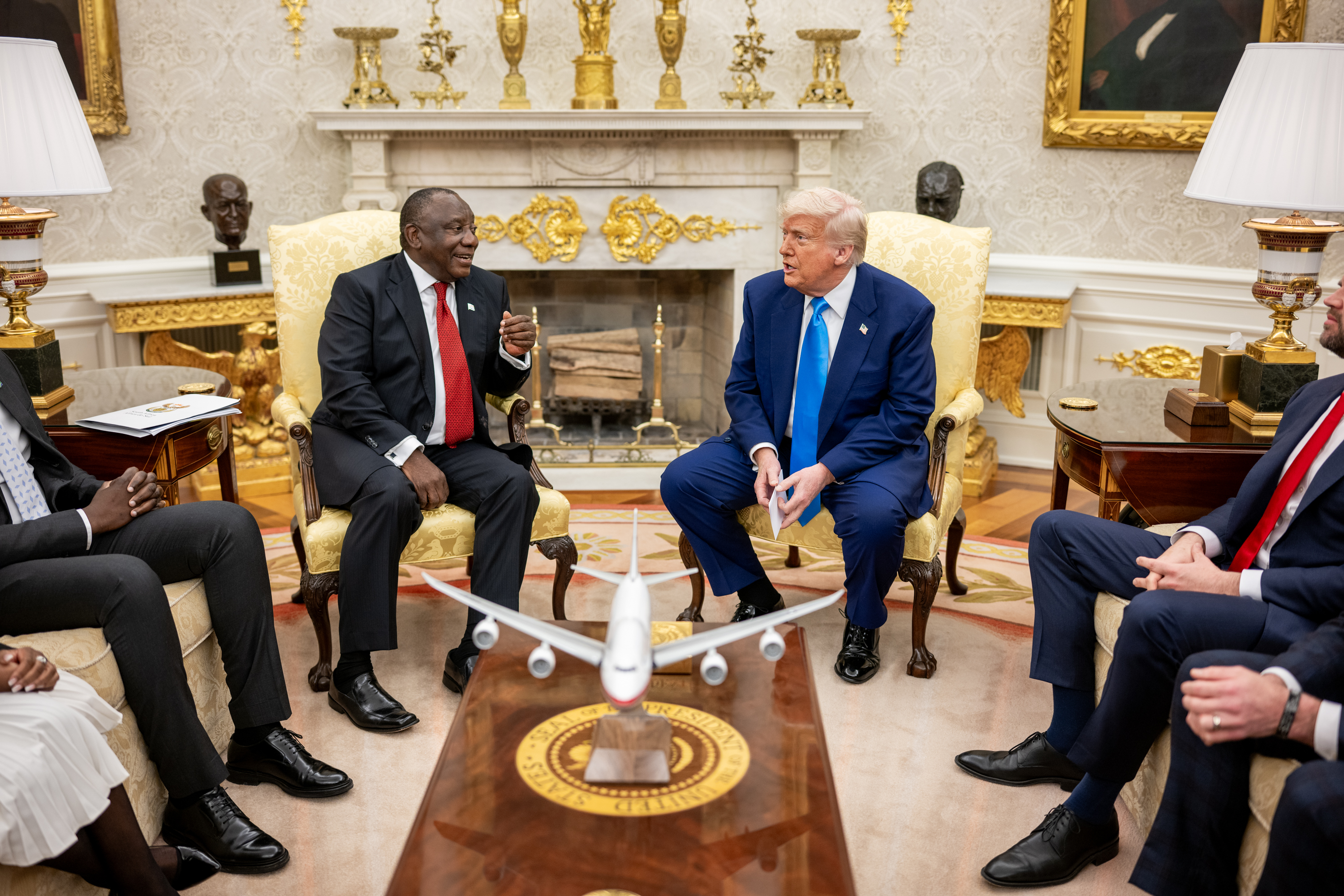
Ramaphosa with U.S. President Donald Trump in the White House, 21 May 2025

In July 2023, Ramaphosa attended the 2023 Russia–Africa Summit in Saint Petersburg and met with Russian President Putin. Ramaphosa called for peace in Ukraine and expressed concern about the global food crisis and rising fertilizer prices.

Ramaphosa called for a ceasefire in the Gaza war, stating "as South Africans we can relate to what is happening to Palestinians". He condemned Israel's blockade of the Gaza Strip and the "collective punishment" of Palestinians in Gaza. Ramaphosa described Israel as an "oppressive regime".

With his support, South Africa filed a case accusing Israel of genocide at the International Court of Justice on Dec. 29, 2023, under the Genocide Convention. In a statement, South Africa said: "President Ramaphosa emphasized that South Africa’s action through the ICJ was an attempt to ensure that the same global solidarity that helped end Apartheid in South Africa should be mobilised to end the Apartheid that Palestinians are experiencing, including an end to the genocide of Palestinians."

In January 2024, Ramaphosa met with Hemedti, the leader of the Rapid Support Forces (RSF), in their first meeting since the start of the Sudanese Civil War. He called for a ceasefire without reference to the humanitarian situation in the country. He has emerged to embrace civilian politicians and tour African capitals in a bid for international legitimacy, analysts said.

In October 2024, he attended the 16th BRICS summit in Kazan, Russia, where he met with Russian President Vladimir Putin, Chinese President Xi Jinping, and other leaders.

In January 2025, South African Defense Minister Angie Motshekga stated that the M23 offensive against South African positions in the Democratic Republic of the Congo, resulting in the death of 13 South African peacekeepers, was only alleviated after President Ramaphosa told the Rwandan government that continued attacks would be interpreted by South Africa as a "declaration of war" by Rwanda. President Ramphosa later also wrote on X that the South African peacekeepers had been killed by the "Rwanda Defence Force (RDF) militia."

On 21 May 2025, Ramaphosa visited the White House in Washington, D.C. for a bilateral meeting with U.S. President Donald Trump, in a high-profile diplomatic engagement aimed at addressing escalating tensions between the two nations. This was after the U.S. offered refugee status to 59 white Afrikaners on the basis of the alleged persecution of the Afrikaner minority and the enactment of the Expropriation Act, 2024. The visit was broadly considered a success, and it was followed by President Ramaphosa announcing that President Trump would attend the 2025 G20 summit in South Africa (which Trump had originally declined to do). International relations experts and economists welcomed the announcement.

In 2026 Ramaphosa endorsed the campaign to free Marwan Barghouti, a Palestinian political leader and prisoner of Israel who has been compared to Nelson Mandela. The move prompted criticism from the South African Zionist Federation.

=== Coronavirus response ===
Ramaphosa has been internationally praised for his response to the COVID-19 pandemic in South Africa with the BBC commenting that, in this regard, "Ramaphosa has emerged as a formidable leader — composed, compassionate, but seized by the urgency of the moment." In October 2020, Ramaphosa began a period of self-isolation after a guest at a dinner party he attended tested positive for coronavirus.

On 12 December 2021, Minister in the Presidency, Mondli Gungubele announced that Ramaphosa had tested positive for COVID-19, and deputy president, David Mabuza would take over "all responsibilities" for the following week.

== Political philanthropy ==
Ramaphosa publicly declared in South Africa on 24 May 2018 that he would be donating half of his salary (R3.6 million annually) to charity in honour of late former South African president Nelson Mandela. He said the gesture was aimed at encouraging the wealthy to dedicate some of their pay to help build the nation. The donation was set to be managed by the Nelson Mandela Foundation (NMF).

Ramaphosa is also the founder of the Cyril Ramaphosa Foundation.

== Controversies ==
=== Marikana massacre ===
The Marikana massacre, as referred to in the media, occurred when police broke up an occupation by striking Lonmin workers of a "koppie" (hilltop) near Nkaneng shack settlement in Marikana on 16 August 2012. As a result of the police shootings, 34 miners died and 78 miners were injured, causing anger and outcry against the police and South African government. Further controversy emerged after it was discovered that most of the victims were shot in the back and many victims were shot far from police lines. The violence on 16 August 2012 was the single most lethal use of force by South African security forces against civilians since the end of the apartheid era.

During the Marikana Commission, it also emerged that Lonmin management solicited Ramaphosa, a Lonmin shareholder and ANC heavyweight, to coordinate "concomitant action" against "criminal" protesters and therefore is seen by many as being responsible for the massacre.

Under the investigation of Farlam committee, Ramaphosa said that Lonmin lobbied government and the SAPS firstly to secure a massive police presence at Lonmin and secondly to characterise what was taking place as a criminal rather than an industrial relations event.

The Marikana Commission of Inquiry ultimately found that given the deaths that had already occurred, his intervention did not cause the increase in police on site, nor did he know the operation would take place on 16 August.

He was employed on the board of directors of Lonmin while taking an active stance when the Marikana Massacre took place on Lonmin's Marikana premises. On 15 August 2012 he called for action against the Marikana miners' strike, which he called "dastardly criminal" conduct that needed "concomitant action" to be taken. He later admitted and regretted his involvement in the act and said that it could have been avoided if contingency plans had been made prior to the labour strike.

=== Extramarital affair ===
In August 2017, the Sunday Independent published an article alleging that Ramaphosa had had several extramarital affairs, including with some women to whom he had given money. Ramaphosa denied the allegations, claiming that they were politically motivated aimed to derail his presidential campaign. Later emails between Ramaphosa and his mistress were leaked. Within the emails were instances of Ramaphosa referring to his mistress as "cupcake". This led to South Africans nicknaming Ramaphosa as "cupcake". Ramaphosa would later admit to the affair, although he denied that there was more than one.

=== CR17 campaign funds ===
On 19 July 2019, the Public Protector, Busisiwe Mkhwebane, released a report in which she claimed that Ramaphosa had intentionally misled the Parliament of South Africa over the controversial Bosasa donations to his CR17 ANC presidential campaign. COPE Leader Mosiuoa Lekota called for Ramaphosa to be impeached while DA Leader Mmusi Maimane proposed the establishment of an ad hoc committee to effectively investigate these allegations. Ramaphosa briefed the nation on 21 July 2019 and described the report as "fundamentally flawed" and called for a judicial review of Mkhwebane's findings.

=== Conduct of business interests ===
Ramaphosa has been criticised for the conduct of his business interests, although he has never been indicted for illegal activity in any of these controversies. Controversial business dealings include his joint venture with Glencore and allegations of benefitting illegally from coal deals with Eskom which he has staunchly denied, during which Glencore was in the public spotlight for its tendentious business activities involving Tony Blair in the Middle East; his son, Andile Ramaphosa, has also been found to have accepted payments totalling R2 million from Bosasa, the security company implicated in corruption and state capture by the Zondo Commission.

=== Phala Phala robbery ===
On 9 February 2020, it is alleged about US$4 million in cash was stolen from Ramaphosa's Phala Phala game farm in Limpopo, although the exact amount was disputed.

Ramaphosa later said the amount was $580,000. In 2022, he was accused of corruption, obstruction of justice, kidnapping and bribing the burglars into silence. After delivery of a report on the matter commissioned by Speaker Nosiviwe Mapisa-Nqakula, the parliament voted on 13 December 2022, 148 for and 214 against the impeachment of the president.. On 11 October 2024, the National Prosecuting Authority (NPA) announced that it would not be prosecuting Ramaphosa or any suspects involved in the case.

=== Tembisa Hospital ===
In October 2025, a video of Ramaphosa with Hangwani Maumela, who is accused of being involved in the Tembisa Hospital looting scandal, went viral. Ramaphosa was once Maumela's uncle through his marriage to Maumela's aunt. Maumela is part of a syndicate accused of defrauding the state of over 2 billion rand. He denied knowing or having met Maumela and claimed he was just walking past Maumela's house when they took the picture. He later admitted to knowing Maumela.

== Honours and awards ==
Ramaphosa received the Olof Palme Prize in Stockholm in October 1987. In 1995, he received the prize "Archivio Disarmo - Golden Doves for Peace" from IRIAD.

In 2009, he received the Golden Plate Award of the American Academy of Achievement in 2009, presented by Awards Council member Archbishop Desmond Tutu at a ceremony at St. George's Cathedral, Cape Town. He has also frequently been listed as an influential individual: he was voted 34th in the 2004 list of Top 100 Great South Africans, and was included in the Time 100 in 2007 and 2019.

He has received honorary doctorates from, among others, the University of Natal, the University of Port Elizabeth, the University of Cape Town, the University of Limpopo, the National University of Lesotho, National University of Galway, the University of Massachusetts Boston, and the University of Pennsylvania.

=== State honours ===
- Algeria: Medal of the Order of National Merit (Athir, 2024)
- Guinea: Grand Cross of the National Order of Merit (2019)
- Saudi Arabia: Collar of the Order of King Abdulaziz (2018)
- Senegal: Grand Cross of the National Order of the Lion (2021)
- United Kingdom: Honorary Knight Grand Cross of the Order of the Bath (GCB, 2022)

== Personal life ==
Ramaphosa was married from 1978 to 1989 to Hope Ramaphosa, with whom he has a son, and from 1991 to 1993 to the now deceased businesswoman Nomazizi Mtshotshisa. In 1996, he married Tshepo Motsepe, a medical doctor and the sister of South African mining billionaire Patrice Motsepe. He is thought to have five children.

He owns a luxury mansion at the foot of Lion's Head in Cape Town, as well as 30 other properties. In 2018, Investing.com estimated his net worth at R6.4 billion ($450 million).

He is a polyglot, and is known for using a variety of South African languages when delivering his speeches.

== See also ==
- List of current heads of state and government
- List of heads of the executive by approval rating

== Notes ==
Political offices
Preceded by Kgalema Motlanthe	Deputy President of South Africa; 2014–2018	Succeeded by David Mabuza
Preceded by Trevor Manuel	Chair of the National Planning Commission; 2014–2018	Succeeded by Nkosazana Dlamini-Zuma
Preceded by Jacob Zuma	President of South Africa; 2018–present	Incumbent
Party political offices
Preceded by Alfred Baphethuxolo Nzo	Secretary General of the African National Congress; 1991–1997	Succeeded by Kgalema Motlanthe
Preceded by Kgalema Motlanthe	Deputy President of the African National Congress; 2012–2017	Succeeded by David Mabuza
Preceded by Jacob Zuma	President of the African National Congress; 2017–present	Incumbent
Trade union offices
New office	General Secretary of the National Union of Mineworkers; 1982–1991	Succeeded by Kgalema Motlanthe
Diplomatic posts
Preceded by (Brazil) Luiz Inácio Lula da Silva	Chairperson of the Group of 20; 2025	Succeeded by (United States) Donald Trump
