= Beneficiary fund =

A beneficiary fund is defined as a pension fund organization in the Pension Funds Act No.24 of 1956 of South Africa, as amended in 2008. A beneficiary fund is a uniquely South African entity designed to accept and administer lump sum death benefits allocated in their discretion by retirement fund trustees to the minor dependants of deceased retirement fund members, as set out in section 37C of the Act. Major dependants are also eligible to accept section 37C death benefits.

Beneficiary funds were introduced in January 2009. Advantages of beneficiary funds are that they are cost effective and tax effective, and offer institutional investment returns. Beneficiary funds are taxed in the same manner as retirement funds in South Africa, that is no tax is paid in the fund. Furthermore, any payment out of a beneficiary fund, whether capital or income, is tax free.

Beneficiary funds are designed to protect the assets of those who receive death benefit payouts. They play an important social role in Southern Africa, particularly for single-parent and child-led households, allowing minor children to stand a better chance of completing their education if their assets are managed in a beneficiary fund vehicle which is protected under the Pension Funds Act and overseen by a board of trustees.

Any retirement fund member, regardless of their level of financial sophistication, can consider the use of a beneficiary fund in estate planning as an alternative to a testamentary trust, by stipulating on their pension fund nomination form that the trustees consider the use of a beneficiary fund in the event of their death.

Traditionally, beneficiary funds were regarded as a vehicle for children's assets but the concept has evolved to become more relevant and attractive to a broader market from a tax savings point of view. The education aspect has remained a dominant benefit of beneficiary funds however, allowing the payment of a monthly income to finance a child's entire education through to tertiary level and beyond. When the member turns 18, the beneficiary fund will engage with the member to determine the best use of his or her remaining funds into the future.

== Governance ==
A beneficiary fund needs to comply with the same regulatory and governance standards as any other South African retirement fund in terms of the Pension Funds Act. The beneficiary fund has a board of trustees who need to register a set of rules with the Financial Sector Conduct Authority (FSCA), previously known as the Financial Services Board.The board of trustees also need to draw up a number of policies in terms of Pension Funds Circular 130, for example a member communication policy, investment policy, code of conduct and a risk policy.

Treating Customers Fairly (TCF) is becoming more central to the legislation governing retirement funds particularly as incorporated into the Conduct of Financial Institutions Bill (COFI).

== Parties involved ==
Retirement funds select a preferred beneficiary fund whose administrator needs to have an administrator license in terms of section 13B of the Pension Funds Act. Major service providers include institutions such Sanlam, Alexander Forbes Group Holdings and independent player Fairheads. Once the funds are in a beneficiary fund, the trustees of the beneficiary fund take over the fiduciary duty from the retirement fund trustees.

Some criticisms of beneficiary funds have involved investment managers running beneficiary funds in order gather assets. Best practice is therefore to outsource this to independent asset managers. Investments need to be in line with Regulation 28 of the Pension Funds Act, which stipulates strict prudential guidelines. In the event of any maladministration or complaints the member has recourse to the Pension Funds Adjudicator.

== Industry and legislative framework ==
Death benefits arising from retirement funds are distributed in accordance with S37c of the Pension Funds Act. This section allows trustees of retirement funds to make decisions regarding the allocation of the death benefits. S37C imposes significant discretionary duties upon trustees, leading to much confusion in the industry, as commented on by various experts.

A 2014 amendment to the Pension Funds Act has broadened the allowable benefits that can go into a beneficiary fund to include all employment-related benefits of the member of the retirement fund.
