= Chartered Institute of Taxation, Ghana =

Regulator of the practice of taxation in Ghana

- Formation: 2 May 1980
- Type: Professional association
- Official language: English
- President: George Ohene Kwatia
- Affiliations: West African Union of Tax Institutes
- Website: www.taxghana.org

The Chartered Institute of Taxation, Ghana (CITG) is the regulator of the practice of taxation in Ghana. It is the only body in Ghana that can certify tax professionals.

== History ==
The institute began operating as a professional body in 1978, and the Ghana Institute of Taxation was incorporated as a limited company on 2 May 1980. It became the Chartered Institute of Taxation on 8 February 2001. As of 2011 a draft bill was in the works to incorporate the CITG through act of parliament. The CITG and the Chartered Institute of Taxation of Nigeria (CITN) were the co-founders of the West African Union of Tax Institutes (WAUTI), launched in May 2011, with the objective of developing and promoting the taxation profession in West Africa.

== Training ==
In April 2010 Yaw Asante-Boadi, President of the CITG noted that a draft tax education and training bill was before Cabinet. The goal was to streamline training of tax practitioners in the country. He noted the importance of such training, and said the law would eventually require that all tax practitioners had gone through a full course in taxation. The CITG conducts examinations twice a year. In 2011 it was undertaking a major review of the syllabus. It had also signed a Memorandum of Understanding with Zenith University College to provide tuition in taxation for students wanting to enter the profession.

== Policy directions ==
In September 2009 members of the Executive Council of the CITG called on recently elected President John Atta Mills, who is himself an expert on taxation. Mills talked of the need for local tax experts to be motivated, and said "We would rely and utilize the store of knowledge that you have so that together we can build a better Ghana. There is hope. We need the money to drive the economy. We’ll be calling on you for your advice". The CITG President Yaw Asante Boadi replied that the group would support any reforms. He called for speeding up the process of passing the Taxation Bill. In September 2010 Alex Tettey-Enyo, the Minister of Education, spoke at the CITG's annual tax celebration in Accra. He called on the institute to increase the number of tax professionals so as to increase the economy's revenue generation, noting the deficit of trained tax experts in the country. He also asked the CITG to monitor the performance of their members and to provide continuous professional education to update their knowledge of new laws, and to establish high ethical standards for tax practitioners.
