= Triphosphoribosyl-dephospho-CoA synthase =

triphosphoribosyl-dephospho-CoA synthase

Identifiers
- EC no.: 2.4.2.52
- CAS no.: 313345-38-9

Databases
- IntEnz: IntEnz view
- BRENDA: BRENDA entry
- ExPASy: NiceZyme view
- KEGG: KEGG entry
- MetaCyc: metabolic pathway
- PRIAM: profile
- PDB structures: RCSB PDB PDBe PDBsum
- Gene Ontology: AmiGO / QuickGO
Search
- PMC: articles
- PubMed: articles
- NCBI: proteins

In enzymology, a triphosphoribosyl-dephospho-CoA synthase (EC 2.4.2.52) is an enzyme that catalyzes the chemical reaction

ATP + 3-dephospho-CoA $\rightleftharpoons$ 2'-(5"-triphosphoribosyl)-3'-dephospho-CoA + adenine

Thus, the two substrates of this enzyme are ATP and 3-dephospho-CoA, whereas its two products are 2'-(5''-triphosphoribosyl)-3'-dephospho-CoA and adenine.

This enzyme belongs to the family of transferases, specifically those transferring non-standard substituted phosphate groups. The systematic name of this enzyme class is ATP:3-dephospho-CoA 5"-triphosphoribosyltransferase. Other names in common use include 2'-(5"-triphosphoribosyl)-3-dephospho-CoA synthase, ATP:dephospho-CoA 5-triphosphoribosyl transferase, and CitG. This enzyme participates in two-component system - general.
