= Chartered Institute of Taxation of Nigeria =

Organization of tax practitioners and administrators

The Chartered Institute of Taxation of Nigeria
- Abbreviation: CITN
- Formation: February 1, 1982; 44 years ago
- Headquarters: Alausa Ikeja, Lagos, Nigeria
- Region served: Nigeria
- Official language: English
- President: Samuel Olusola AGBELUYI, mni, FCTI
- Vice President: Innocent Chinyere OHAGWA, FCTI
- Website: www.citn.org

The Chartered Institute of Taxation of Nigeria (CITN) is a professional organization in Nigeria whose members are certified as qualified tax practitioners or administrators.

== Organization ==
The CITN was formed in February 1982 and chartered by the Federal Government of Nigeria by the enabling Act No. 76 of 1992. Members of the institute may be Accounting, Legal or other professionals who have obtained the relevant tax expertise. The institute provides training and conducts examinations to determine eligibility. The CITN offers an Advanced Diploma in International Taxation to CITN members who work in international tax. The CITN has been criticized for not providing enough training to members at subsidized rates.

== Affiliations ==
The CITN cooperates with the United Kingdom-based Chartered Institute of Taxation. CITN is also affiliated with the South African Institute of Tax Practitioners and the West African Union of Tax Institutes. The CITN has a working relationship with the Association of National Accountants of Nigeria (ANAN) to promote XBRL recommendations and specifications in Nigeria. The CITN is a member of the Financial Reporting Council of Nigeria. The CITN is also a member of the International Tax Directors Forum (ITDF) and the Association of African Tax Institutes (AATI).

== Council Members (2025/2026) ==
Innocent Chinyere OHAGWA, FCTI President

Simon Nwanmaghyi KATO, FCTI Vice President

Titilayo Eni-itan FOWOKAN, mni, FCTI Deputy Vice President

Ishola Akingbade, mni, FCTI Honorary Treasurer

Samuel Agbeluyi, mni, FCTI Immediate Past President

Kolawole Ezekiel BABARINDE, FCTI MEMBER

Ruth Oluwabamike AROKOYO, (Mrs.) (Dr.), FCTI MEMBER

Sheriff Adeyemi SANNI, (Dr.), FCTI MEMBER

Funso Olutayo ABIDAKUN, FCTI MEMBER

Abubakar ZAID, (Dr.), FCTI MEMBER

Abiola Ruth ADIMULA, (Mrs.) (Dr.), FCTI MEMBER

Caroline Mary NDUBUISI, (Mrs.) (Dr.), FCTI MEMBER

Sule Adamu MAINA, FCTI MEMBER

Ezinwa Nwanyieze OKOROAFOR, FCTI MEMBER

Ibrahim Alfadarai USMAN, FCTI MEMBER

Adesina Isaac ADEDAYO, mni, FCTI MEMBER

Fuad LAGUDA, FCTI (Hon.) Rep. CITN in the House of Rep.

Aliyu WADADA, FCTI (Sen.) Rep. CITN in the Senate

Gbenga DANIEL, (Dr), FCTI Rep. Executive Chairman, NRS

Mohammad Akaro MAINOMA, mni, FCTI (Prof.) Rep. of Tertiary Education (Universities)

Adamu Bello LAWAL, FCTI Rep. of Tertiary Education (Polytechnics)

Okon OKON, FCTI Rep. of Joint Tax Board

Usman MUAZU, FCTI (Alhaji) Rep. of Joint Tax Board

Basheer ABDULKADIR Rep. of Federal Ministry of Finance

Ali Manga BULAMA, FCTI Rep. of North-Eastern Region

Aminu Saliu MIKAILU, FCTI (Prof.) Coopted Member

Chukwuemeka EZE, FCTI LEGAL ADVISER

Abiodun A. OLATUNJI, (SAN), ACTI LEGAL ADVISER

Titilola Anthonia AKINLAWON, (SAN), FCTI LEGAL ADVISER

Layi BABATUNDE, (SAN), FCTI LEGAL ADVISER

Charles Amajuoritse AJUYAH, (SAN), ACTI LEGAL ADVISER

Abdulmumini Bala AHMED (Prof.), ACTI LEGAL ADVISER

Mrs. Afolake OSO, FCTI REGISTRAR/CHIEF EXECUTIVE

== In the news ==
In March 2011, Prince Rasaq Adekunle Quadri, former President of the CITN, was elected the first President of the West African Union of Tax Institutes (WAUTI). WAUTI is the umbrella body of tax Institutes in the region. In May 2011, Sebastian Owuama, President of Institute of Chartered Accountants of Nigeria, attended the annual tax conference of the CITN in Abuja where he called for an end to the squabble between ICAN and the CITN. In June 2011, Sunday Jegede, president of the CITN, was elected first President of the Association of African Tax Institutes (AATI). The AATI was formally inaugurated in South Africa in October 2011 during the Annual Tax Conference of the South Africa Institute of Taxation.
