= Association of African Tax Institutes =

The Association of African Tax Institutes (AATI) is an industry association whose aim is, among other things, to provide a platform of collaboration between tax professionals in Africa and to help bridge the divide between tax professionals in the countries of member bodies, their governments and taxpayers.

== Formation ==
The establishment of a Pan-African association for tax institutes was initiated and spearheaded by Stiaan Klue, the Chief Executive of the SA Institute of Tax Practitioners (SAIT).

The AATI was launched during a meeting of Presidents of Taxation Institutes and Heads of Revenue Agencies in Africa in Lagos in June 2011. Countries represented at the founding of AATI included South Africa, Nigeria, Liberia, Sierra Leone, Ghana, The Gambia, Côte d'Ivoire, Libya and Kenya. Sunday Jegede, president of the Chartered Institute of Taxation of Nigeria (CITN) was elected inaugural President. Two vice-presidents were elected, one from Ghana and one from South Africa. Representatives from Liberia and Côte d'Ivoire are respectively Honorary Treasurer and Secretary.

Sunday Jegede said the AATI would help bridge the gap between the tax system and professionals in member countries, and would encourage all African countries to establish professional bodies. These would ensure that tax practice would be conducted by skilled professionals, and would help `their governments formulate sound tax policies. Jegede said the AATI would further economic collaboration, harmonisation and integration within the continent through the use of taxation. He described this as a veritable economic transformation tool. The secretariat of the AATI will be in Ghana.

The association was formally inaugurated in South Africa in October 2011 during the Annual Tax Conference of the SA Institute of Tax Practitioners (SAIT).
