= South African Institute of Taxation =

Organization

South African Institute of Taxation (SAIT)
- Abbreviation: SAIT
- Formation: 2007
- Type: Professional association and regulating controlling body of tax professionals
- Headquarters: Pretoria, Gauteng
- Members: 8 500
- Affiliations: International Tax Directors' Forum and African Association of Tax Institutes
- Website: http://www.thesait.org.za

The South African Institute of Taxation (SAIT) is a leading professional body dedicated exclusively to taxation in South Africa. Recognized under the National Qualifications Framework Act, 2008, SAIT sets and upholds professional standards for tax practitioners, providing accreditation, education, and regulatory oversight to ensure excellence and compliance in the industry.

== Formation and activities ==
SAIT is a not for profit professional body incorporated in 2007 by a group of tax professionals and educators. The SAIT is governed by a Constitution, with a Board elected by members.

When SAIT was formed in 2007, the Institute announced that one member of the Board may be nominated by the South African Revenue Service (SARS). SARS said they agreed in principle with the general objectives of SAIT.

In 2014 SAICA joined SAIT and other SARS recognised controlling bodies to host the Tax Indaba - SAIT is the founder of the Tax Indaba in South Africa.

Other organisations representing tax professionals in the country are the South African Institute of Chartered Accountants (SAICA) and the South African Institute of Professional Accountants (SAIPA).

In March 2011 the CEO of the institute, Dr Klue, joined with Nicolaas van Wyk of the Association of Chartered Certified Accountants in calling for simplification of South African tax laws, pointing out that many businesses remained in the informal sector due to the cost and difficulty of registration. SAIT publishes TaxTalk every two months. The magazine deals with tax issues for the South African market.

In 2014, in comparison to the global average top rate of 32%, South Africa's top personal income tax rate of 40% was high, and in comparison to the global average corporate tax rate of 24%, South Africa's was 28%. According to SAIT, that suggested that South Africa's tax burden is high compared to other jurisdictions. Because it was important for South Africa to be competitive, in order to encourage economic growth, SAIT recommended to Parliament that they reduce the corporate tax rate to bolster foreign direct investment, infrastructure development and growth.

== Membership ==
SAIT members in good standing have reciprocal benefits of several other international tax institutes, including the Canadian Tax Foundation, Chartered Institute of Taxation (UK), Taxation Institute of Australia, Irish Tax Institute, Chartered Institute of Taxation of Nigeria, Chamber of Tax Advisers of the Czech Republic and the Dutch Association of Tax Advisors (NOB). SAIT is a member of the International Tax Directors Forum (ITDF).

SAIT has been collaborating and exchanging information with African Tax professional bodiesChartered Institute of Taxation of Nigeria since 2007. During 2010 the SAIT Chief Executive, Dr Stiaan Klue, initiated the establishment of a Pan-African body for tax associations. In June 2011 SAIT participated in a meeting in Lagos, Nigeria in which it was agreed to establish the Association of African Tax Institutes (AATI). The SAIT CE is a vice president of AATI.

== See also ==
- Fiduciary Institute of Southern Africa
