= Alexander Forbes Group Holdings =

South African financial services group

Alexander Forbes Group Holdings Limited
- Type: Public: JSE: AFH
- Industry: Financial services
- Founded: 1935; 91 years ago
- Headquarters: Sandton, South Africa
- Areas served: South Africa; Botswana; Namibia; Channel Islands
- Key people: Kuseni Dlamini (Chairman); Dawie de Villiers (CEO); Bruce Bydawell (CFO)
- Products: Asset & Fund Management
- Number of employees: 2,587
- Website: www.alexforbes.com

Alexforbes (officially Alexander Forbes Group Holdings Limited) is a South African diversified financial services organization.

Headquartered in Johannesburg, the company has a presence outside of South Africa, in Namibia, Botswana, and in the Channel Islands through an offshore Jersey operation.

== History ==
Alexforbes operations date back to the consolidation of insurance agencies in South Africa in 1935, when the original business was founded as Price Forbes, later changing its name to Price Forbes Life and Pension Brokers in 1955.

In the 1970s, Price Forbes Life and Pension Brokers began diversifying its range of services to include fund administration, employee benefit consulting and actuarial services as well as retirement and estate planning. Due to the diversification, the business name was changed to Price Forbes Employee Benefits Consultants.

Following a number of acquisitions by the group in the early 1980s, the name was changed to Alexander Forbes Financial Services.

The Group commenced international expansion in 1990 with the establishment of a small insurance brokerage operation in London and Jersey, which the Group later expanded through the acquisition of Nelson Hurst plc. The insurance brokerage business was also expanded into other African countries to continue servicing South African corporate clients which were expanding into these markets.

In 2002, the Group further expanded its international financial services business through the acquisition of a 60% interest in Lane Clark & Peacock (LCP), a leading actuarial consultancy firm in the UK. This was followed by further acquisitions of the businesses that formed Investment Solutions in the UK, Alexander Forbes Consultants and Actuaries (AFCA UK) and Media Insurance Services (Direct Marketing), and the expansion of LCP into Belgium, Ireland, The Netherlands and Switzerland.

Between 2012 and 2014, the Group disposed of a number of these interests, including the sale of AFCA UK, Investment Solutions UK, Media Insurance Services, LCP Switzerland and Alexander Forbes Trustee Services to focus on its core markets.

In 2006, Actis Capital LLP, Ethos Private Equity Ltd and Harbourvest Partners LLC made an offer of ZAR 7.4 Billion rand (US$980Million) for the acquisition of the entire stock of Alexander Forbes other than 30% that was held by Staff and B-BBEE Partner Shanduka Group. The deal was said to be the largest and most complex leveraged buy-outs ever undertaken in Africa. This led to the delisting of Alexander Forbes from the JSE.

On 24 July 2014, Alexander Forbes announced an offer for shares to existing shareholders, institutional investors and to other selected investors. The Offer Shares were for sale at a price between ZAR 6.90 and ZAR 8.05 per share. The offer had Deutsche Bank AG, Morgan Stanley & Company and Rand Merchant Bank as its book runners. The IPO managed to raise ZAR 3.7 Billion (US$345 million). This IPO marked Alexander Forbes' return to the JSE since its exit in 2006.

Alexander Forbes operates in Botswana, Namibia, South Africa and Jersey. In 2019, the company won the Five Year (Fund of Funds), HedgeNews Africa Awards. In 2020, the company's CIO Sandra La Bella was awarded with Visionary CIO of the Year by The Institute of Information Technology Professionals South Africa. In 2021, the company was honored with Global Africa Fund Survey Providers- Best Investment Survey Provider.

== Operations ==
Alexforbes offers employee benefits consulting (including healthcare), investment management, insurance and wealth management solutions to both corporate clients and individual customers.

The company is listed on the Johannesburg Stock Exchange (JSE) and its clients span both the private and public sector market segments on the institutional side, and individual members.

== Shareholding ==
Top 10 (Strategic and Institutional shareholders as at 28 January 2022)

Rank	Name	% ISC
1	African Rainbow Capital	39.9
2	Marsh & McLennan Companies	14.8
3	Coronation Fund Managers	4.6
4	Abax Investments	5.5
5	Visio Capital Management	6.9
6	Public Investment Corporation	6.0
7	Dimensional Fund Advisors	1.3
8	Kagiso Asset Management	1.1
9	The Vanguard Group	1.7
10	Sanlam Investment Management	3.4
*ISC – issued share capital

== Notable employees ==
- Former British prime minister John Major worked at the London office of the bank for a brief period in 1959.

== See also ==
- Economy of South Africa
