= Shanduka Group =

South African investment holding company

Shanduka Group was a South African investment holding company which was merged into Phembani Group in June 2015. Its interests included extractive resources, telecommunications, food and beverage, property, financial services, energy, and industrial sectors. It was founded in 2001 by South African president Cyril Ramaphosa and owned by Multi Rand Millionaire Lungile Zondo. Oratile Zondo is the CEO.

China’s sovereign wealth fund, the China Investment Corporation (CIC), acquired a 25 per cent stake in the company for about $243 million in December 2011.

In 2012, the company acquired a $335 million stake in telecommunications provider MTN.

Controlling shareholder Ramaphosa sold his interest in Shanduka Group to Phembani Group in 2015, into which the company merged.

== Controversy ==
In November 2017, Shanduka Group was indicted in the Paradise Papers as one of the few South African companies working with Investec to dodge taxes on profits made from an energy deal in Mozambique by offshoring money to Mauritius.
