= Chamber of Tax Advisers of the Czech Republic =

The Chamber of Tax Advisers of the Czech Republic is an institution guaranteeing high professional level of tax advisory services in the Czech Republic. The Chamber watches over proper performance of tax advisory services, regulates activities of tax advisers, creates preconditions for improvement of their qualification, offers its members a wide range of various services, protects and promotes their rightful interests and helps to form a suitable environment for tax advisers' work.

== Constitution ==
The Chamber is an independent professional organization of tax advisers. Its existence is given by the Tax Advisory Services and the Chamber of Tax Advisers of the Czech Republic Act no. 523/1992 Coll., which came into effect on 1 December 1992. This act regulates both the position and activities of tax advisers and the activity of the Chamber itself. The Tax Advisory Services Act guarantees demanded professional standards of the profession, regulates the position of the Chamber of Tax Advisers, rights and duties of tax advisers and defines tax advisory services themselves as provision of legal help and financial-economic advice concerning taxes, tax payments, duties and other payments as well as concerning things associated directly with taxes. Pursuant to this act, only those individuals who are listed on the list of the Chamber of Tax Advisers of the Czech Republic can be considered as tax advisers. Tax advisers are compulsory members of the Chamber by law.

The autonomous character of the Chamber is an important feature which ensures the independence of the Chamber and at the same time it is a precondition for its high professional level.

== Bodies of the Chamber ==
- General Assembly
- Presidium
- Supervisory Committee
- Disciplinary Committee
- Examination Board

== Performance of tax advisory services ==
The regulation of performance of tax advisory services has its basis in the law and subsequently in the Statutes of the Chamber. Pursuant to the Tax Advisory Services Act, only those individuals who are listed on the list of the Chamber of Tax Advisers of the Czech Republic can be considered as tax advisers. Tax adviser is entitled and obliged to protect rights and rightful interests of his/her client. He/she is obliged to act honestly and conscientiously, to use all legal means consistently and to apply everything he/she considers to be beneficial in accordance with his/her own conscience and client's order. Tax advisory services are based on independence, high professional qualification and tax advisers guarantee extensive professional confidentiality and full responsibility for potential harm to their clients.

An important legislative change in the field of tax advisory services was brought by the amendment of Tax Advisory Services and the Chamber of Tax Advisers Act no. 523/1992 Coll., with effect from the 1st of July 2008. This amendment regulates the position of legal entities entitled to perform tax advisory services. The amendment responds to the change of the Administration of Taxes Act from 2007, by which the legislative term “tax adviser” has involved also legal entities entitled to provide tax advisory services, and thus has enabled these legal entities to represent clients in tax procedures to the same extent to which tax advisers can do that. These legal entities are not members of the Chamber. The Chamber records them on a special list and, as providers of tax advisory services, these legal entities must observe the Act no. 523/1992 Coll.
