= Anti-apartheid movement in the United States =

The anti-apartheid movement was a worldwide effort to end South Africa's apartheid regime and its oppressive policies of racial segregation. The movement emerged after the National Party in South Africa won the general election of 1948 and enforced a system of racial segregation through legislation. Opposition to the apartheid system came from both within South Africa and the international community, in particular, the United Kingdom and the United States. The anti-apartheid movement consisted of a series of demonstrations, economic divestment, and boycotts against South Africa. In the United States, anti-apartheid efforts were initiated primarily by nongovernmental human rights organizations. On the other hand, state and federal governments were reluctant to support the call for sanctions against South Africa due to a Cold War alliance with the country and profitable economic ties. The rift between public condemnation of apartheid and the U.S. government's continued support of the South African government delayed efforts to negotiate a peaceful transfer to majority rule. Eventually, a congressional override of President Ronald Reagan's veto resulted in passage of the Comprehensive Anti-Apartheid Act in 1986. However, the extent to which the anti-apartheid movement contributed to the downfall of apartheid between 1990 and 1994 remains under debate.

== Anti-Apartheid movement during the Civil Rights era ==
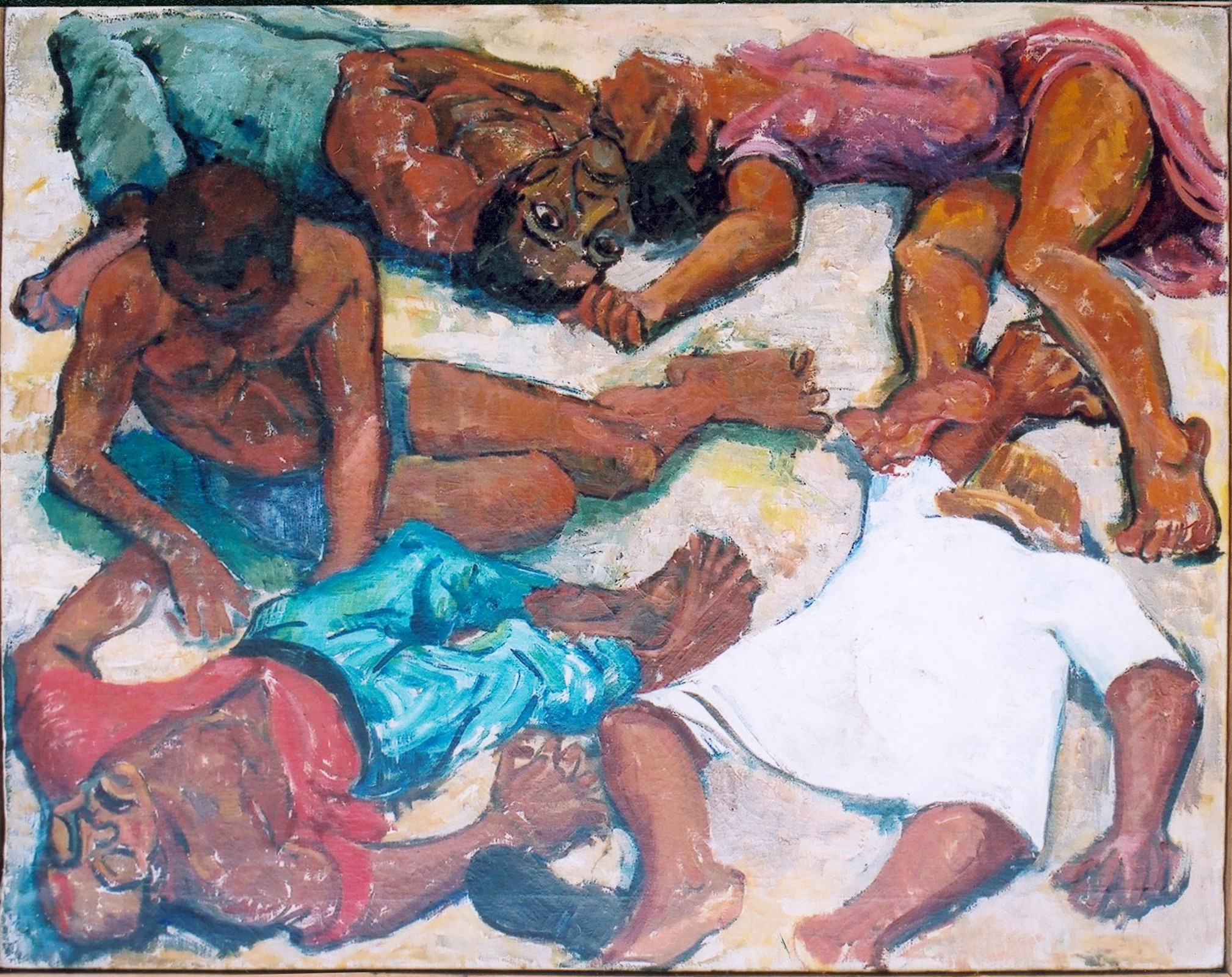
Painting of the Sharpeville massacre in 1960

=== Connections with civil rights organizations ===
The origins of the anti-apartheid movement in the United States can be traced back to 1949, when apartheid laws were first enacted. Although anti-apartheid efforts did not gain much momentum during the beginning of the Civil Rights era, several organizations supported the defiance campaign in South Africa. In the early years, the Council on African Affairs (CAA) devoted to the liberation of Africans against colonialism. Led by Alphaeus Hunton, the CAA published educational content and lobbied the federal government and the United Nations for economic disengagement from South Africa. The CAA, however, shortly decline in activity and eventually succumbed to anti-Communist government repression in 1955.

Following the Sharpeville massacre in 1960, during which South African police opened fire on a group of unarmed protestors, there was a significant change in public opinion in the United States about South Africa. The massacre fomented a connection between the civil rights movement, the defiance campaign for African liberation, and the resistance to the apartheid system in South Africa. However, the anti-apartheid movement was soon overshadowed by domestic issues, including the Cold War and resistance against the Vietnam War.

=== Creation of the American Committee on Africa (ACOA) ===
The American Committee on Africa (ACOA) was the first major group devoted to the anti-apartheid campaign. Founded in 1953 by Paul Robeson and a group of civil rights activist, the ACOA encouraged the U.S. government and the United Nations to support African independence movements, including the National Liberation Front in Algeria and the Gold Coast drive to independence in present-day Ghana. The ACOA garnered support from civil rights groups such as the Congress of Racial Equality (CORE) as well as churches and labor unions. During the 1960s, the ACOA participated in demonstrations, lobbying, and sit-ins to protest the United States’ governmental and business relations in South Africa. Most notably, the ACOA joined a union of churches to create the Washington Office in Africa as a permanent lobbying arm for relief projects in South Africa.

American anti-apartheid activists advocated for a greater attention on apartheid as the South African Airways advertised flights from Johannesburg to New York City. In 1969, a group of anti-apartheid activists, including the ACOA and Representative Charles Diggs Jr. (D-MI) challenged SAA's entry into the United States, claiming that such travel would violate domestic civil rights laws of nondiscrimination. The case was subsequently taken to court, and though it remained unresolved, activists leveraged efforts at blocking SAA's federal route to opposing South Africa's broader apartheid rules.

=== Early divestment and sanctions ===
Under the Truman and Eisenhower administration, the U.S. government took a reactionary role against South Africa's apartheid system, with leaders accepting the legitimacy of white supremacy in an attempt to maintain the flow of governmental and business relations. Support for the anti-apartheid movement primarily involved small groups of activists and had limited impact. The ACOA participated in civil rights groups such as the Congress of Racial Equality and the National Association of Colored People (NAACP) in pressuring businesses to divest investment from South Africa. Throughout the 1960s, churches and civil rights groups also organized protests, boycotts, and litigation campaigns to oppose apartheid.

However, resistance to the apartheid system was outweighed by the prevailing U.S. economic interests in South Africa. The United States was determined to secure South African uranium production and mutually beneficial trade relationships. Until 1958, the United States abstained from voting on UN resolutions concerning South Africa's discriminatory policies. As hypocrisies of the U.S. government became apparent in the reaction to the Sharpeville massacre in 1960, Rep. Ron Dellums of California and Rep. John Conyers of Detroit introduced the first divestment legislation to the U.S. Congress in 1972, paving the way for subsequent campaigns against bank loans to South Africa.

== Anti-Apartheid movement during the 1970s and 1980s ==
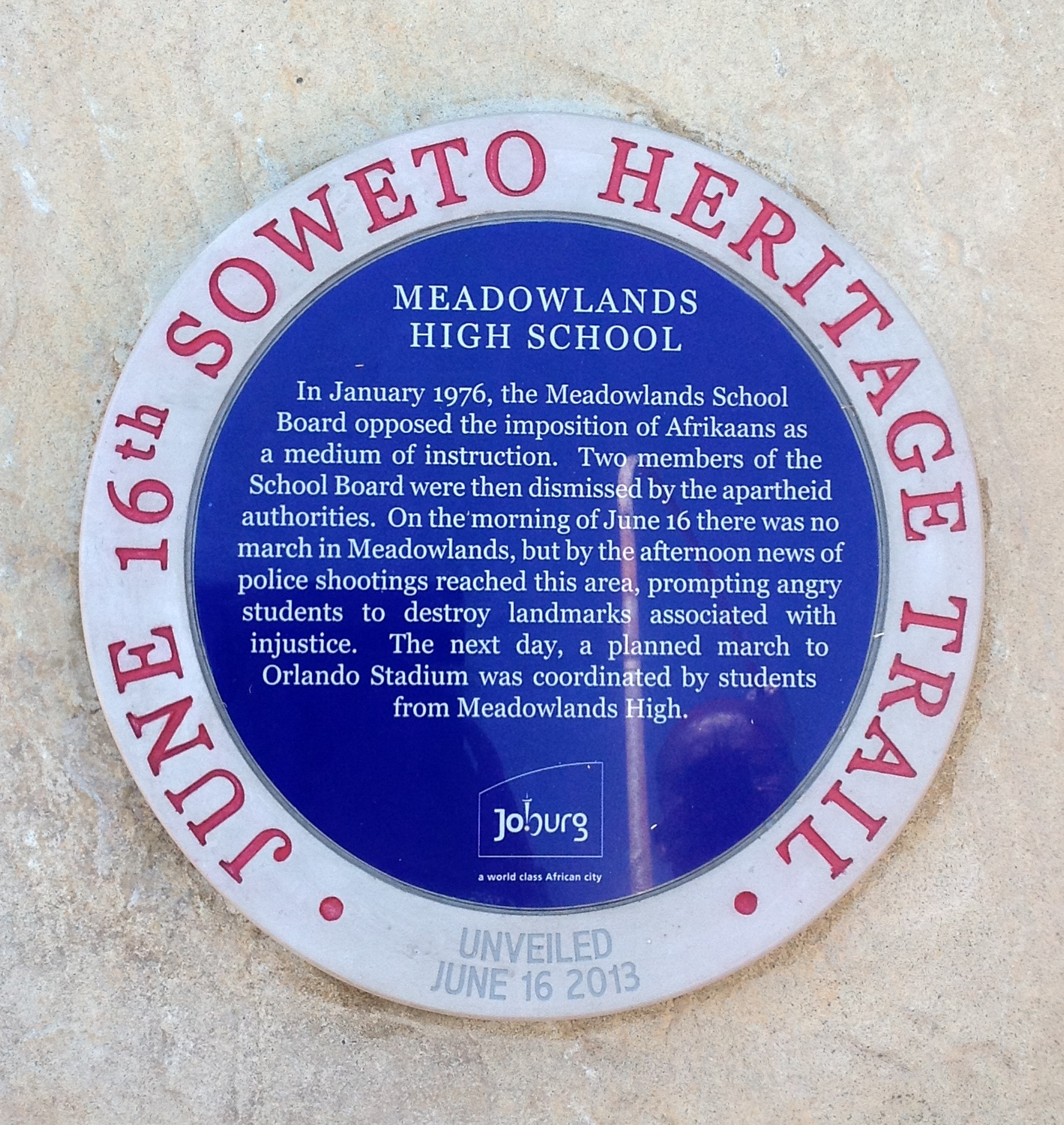
Plaque at Meadowlands High School opposing the imposition of Afrikaans as a medium of instruction

=== Creation of TransAfrica ===
The U.S. anti-apartheid movement gained rapid momentum after the Soweto uprising of 1976, which was a series of student-led demonstrations against the government's decree of imposing Afrikaans as the medium of instruction in all black schools. At the 1976 Black Forum on Foreign Policy Leadership Conference, attendees expressed a need for a separate, outside organization to complement efforts of the Congressional Black Caucus (CBC) inside Congress. As a result, the CBC helped establish TransAfrica in 1977 as a Black American foreign policy organization. Similar to the ACOA, TransAfrica was not exclusively an anti-apartheid organization but rather a body that addressed Afro-Caribbean concerns. Led by Randall Robinson, TransAfrica organized protest movements throughout the United States, including demonstrates outside the South African embassy that resulted in 5,000 Americans being arrested. In addition, it also advocated for progressive viewpoints in U.S. foreign policy debates by amplifying the voices of African Americans. Soon after its establishment, TransAfrica became the largest anti-apartheid organizer in the United States.

=== Free South Africa Movement ===
In 1984, TransAfrica was a founding member of the Free South Africa Movement. Having learned from the mistakes its predecessors, the Free South Africa Movement dogmatically pursued to campaign against apartheid in South Africa, rather than diluting its focus across multiple countries. The group worked closely with members of Congress to introduce legislations imposing economic sanctions in South Africa. Following the protest at the South African embassy in Washington, D.C., sit-ins and demonstrations took place at South African consulates across the United States. Together, the activities of TransAfrica and the Free South Africa Movement greatly increased support for economic sanctions. Universities, banks, businesses, and local governments also began to withdraw their ties to South Africa and push members of Congress to impose more stringent measures.

=== Demonstrations at universities ===
The humanitarian goals of the Free South Africa Movement attracted widespread support from colleges and universities to mobilize against South African apartheid. Students and faculty members protested, demonstrated, and signed petitions to pressure their institutions’ board of trustees to divest of South Africa-related securities. Organizations such as the Co-op system at the University of California Berkeley called on students to withdraw their accounts from Bank of America to protest the bank's loans to South Africa. These student-led divestment campaigns eventually led local and state governments to pass legislation requiring divestment of holdings in companies conducting business in South Africa.

Furthermore, using a new tactic of protest known as the shantytown, students created their own shantytowns in the middle of campus to demonstrate the deplorable living conditions in South Africa. The Free South Africa Coordinating Committee at the University of Michigan built the first shantytown in 1986. By 1990, more than 46 shantytown events occurred at college campuses across the country. In addition to shantytowns, Black students at Ohio State University protested against university policies and practices regarding minority students in what became known as the “Black Student Movement." Scholarship programs were also expanded to encourage black South African students to study in U.S. colleges and universities.

== Sports and cultural boycotts ==
=== Banned participation at the Olympic games ===
Flag used by South Africa at the 1992 Summer Olympic Games

Opposition to South Africa's participation in the Olympics began with Dennis Brutus, a South African political activist. In 1961, Brutus founded the South African Sports Association, which became the South African Non-Racial Olympic Committee (SAN-ROC) in 1963. During the 1964 Tokyo Olympics, the International Olympic Committee (IOC) banned South Africa from participating in the Olympics over its discriminatory practices under the apartheid. The stipulations outlined by the IOC required that the South African sports teams be multiracial. Under John Vorster, the new South Africa Primer Minister, the South African government introduced a "New Sports Policy" as an attempt to diversify its sports teams. Upon investigation by the IOC, however, it was found that Olympic trials for South African teams were separated by race, with the best from each group qualifying for the mixed-race team. As a result of South Africa's continual discriminatory practices, an international boycott campaign was formed to oppose South Africa's participation in the 1968 Mexico City Olympics, which prompted the IOC to withdraw its invitation to South Africa.

The ban against South African participation in the Olympics was not lifted until 1992, the same year when South Africa formally ended its apartheid system. Readmission to the Olympic games hinged on further progress toward integration of South African sports. At the 1992 Barcelona Olympics, South African athletes competed under a neutral Olympic flag. Following the election of Nelson Mandela in 1994, South Africa entered the Olympic stage under its post-apartheid flag for the first time at the 1996 Olympic games.

=== Artists and athletes against apartheid ===
The cultural and entertainment boycott represented another important avenue to express opposition to South Africa's apartheid. Since the 1960s, many artists and entertainers have declared that they will not perform in South Africa or have their works shown there because of the government's rigid adherence to apartheid. Others participated in anti-apartheid events or contributed financially to international campaigns for the dismantling of apartheid in South Africa. As protests against artists who performed in South Africa occurred, tennis player Arthur Ashe and singer Harry Belafonte founded Artists and Athletes Against Apartheid in 1983 to lobby for sanctions and embargoes against the South African government. The group consisted of more than sixty U.S. artists and athletes, including Tony Bennett, Bill Cosby, and Muhammad Ali, who refused to perform in South Africa until the apartheid was dismantled. In 1985, Steven Van Zandt and Arthur Baker also founded the protest group Artists United Against Apartheid and produced the record Sun City to voice concerns for apartheid and the imprisonment of Nelson Mandela. Proceeds from the album were donated to The Africa Fund to support humanitarian efforts of anti-apartheid groups.

== Legislative changes ==
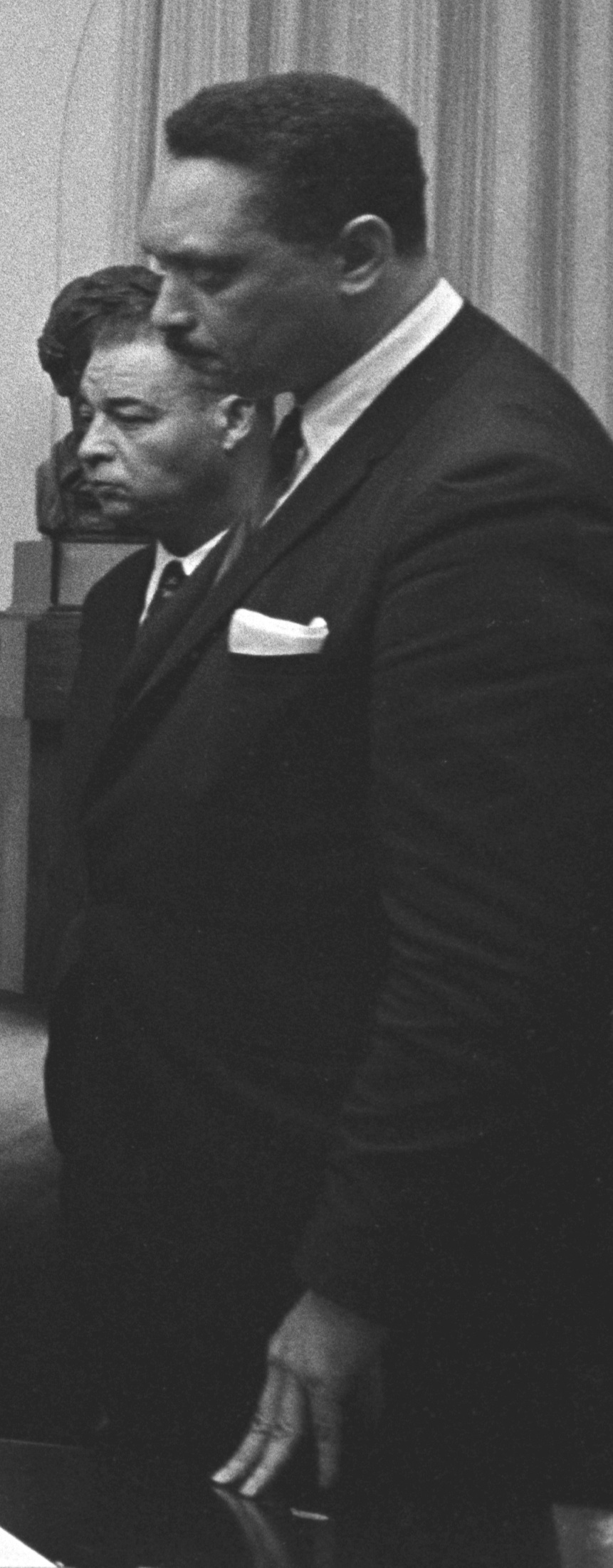
Rev. Leon Sullivan, developer of the Sullivan Principles of corporate social responsibility

=== Constructive engagement ===
After the 1980 election, President Ronald Reagan's adopted the policy of constructive engagement with South Africa in 1981. Written by Reagan's Assistant Secretary of State Chester Crocker, the policy called for easing economic sanctions and improving trade relationships to gradually steer South Africa away from the apartheid system. South Africa's role as a critical Cold War ally and a profitable investment environment led the Reagan administration to avoid anti-apartheid rhetoric and remain political and economically engaged in South Africa. However, with increasing pressure from Congress, university students, and civil rights activists, combined with the lack of actionable changes within South Africa's government, Reagan was forced to reassess his policies towards South Africa. Debate ensues on whether constructive engagement helped end or prolong South Africa's apartheid system.

=== Sullivan principles ===
In the late 1970s through the 1980s, the Sullivan Principles has been used as a criterion for divestment of business holdings in South Africa. Developed by Reverend Leon Sullivan, the code called for non-segregation of races in the workforce, fair employment practices, equal pay, increased training programs, promotion potential for nonwhite South Africans, and improved quality of life standards for employees. Although the Sullivan Principles were intended to promote desegregation and improve conditions for black South African workers, they were condemned by U.S. anti-apartheid activists as being reformist and irrelevant to the structural issues of the apartheid. Companies were forced to work within a legal system in which blacks were disenfranchised of basic economic and political rights in South Africa.

=== Comprehensive Anti-Apartheid Act of 1986 ===
With support from members of the Free South Africa Movement, Congress passed the Comprehensive Anti-Apartheid Act of 1986 designed to end apartheid in South Africa. The act called for sanctions on trade, investment, and travel between the United States and South Africa and stated preconditions for lifting the sanctions. Initially, President Reagan vetoed the Comprehensive Anti-Apartheid Act of 1986, upholding his policy of constructive engagement. Though Reagan endorsed the "spirit" of the Comprehensive Anti-Apartheid Act in helping U.S. firms fight apartheid from within South Africa, Regan believed that harsh economic sanctions were not the best course of action. Eventually, Congress took matters into its own hands by overriding the presidential veto and voting the Comprehensive Anti-Apartheid Act into law in October 1986.
