= International sanctions during apartheid =

As a response to South Africa's policies of apartheid, the international community adopted economic sanctions as a form of condemnation and pressure from the 1960s through to the 1980s.

On 6 November 1962, the United Nations General Assembly passed Resolution 1761, a non-binding resolution condemning South African apartheid policies, establishing the United Nations Special Committee against Apartheid and calling for imposing economic and other sanctions on South Africa. On 7 August 1963 the United Nations Security Council passed Resolution 181, calling for a voluntary arms embargo against South Africa and that very year the Special Committee Against Apartheid would encourage and oversee plans of action against the country.

While nations such as the United States and the United Kingdom were at first reluctant to place sanctions, by the late 1980s both countries, as well as 23 other nations, had passed laws placing various trade sanctions on South Africa.

Economic sanctions against South Africa placed a significant pressure on the government that helped to end apartheid. In 1990, President Frederik Willem (F.W.) de Klerk recognised the economic unsustainability of the burden of international sanctions, released the African nationalist leader Nelson Mandela and unbanned the African National Congress (ANC). In April 1991, the European Economic Community (EEC) lifted economic sanctions on South Africa. De Klerk and Mandela guided the country to its first democratic elections in 1994, which resulted in Mandela being elected president. When Mandela was asked if economic sanctions helped to bring an end to the apartheid system, Mandela replied "Oh, there is no doubt."

== History ==
Apartheid was a system of institutionalised racial segregation that existed in South Africa and South West Africa (now Namibia) from 1948 to 1994,

This was followed by Jamaica, which banned goods from apartheid South Africa in 1959.

=== 1940s–1950s ===
India became the first country to sever trade relations with South Africa for its policies in 1946 when Jawaharlal Nehru's interim government did so. The trigger for this move was the South African Government's passage of the Asiatic Land Tenure and Indian Representation Act, 1946 (known as the "Ghetto Act"), which severely restricted property ownership and trading rights for South Africans of Indian descent.

=== 1960s ===
On 6 November 1962, the United Nations General Assembly passed Resolution 1761, a non-binding resolution condemning South African apartheid policies, establishing the United Nations Special Committee against Apartheid and calling for imposing economic and other sanctions on South Africa. On 7 August 1963 the United Nations Security Council passed Resolution 181 calling for a voluntary arms embargo against South Africa, and that very year, the Special Committee Against Apartheid would encourage and oversee plans of action against the regime.

Following this passage of this resolution the UK-based Anti-Apartheid Movement spearheaded the arrangements for an international conference on sanctions to be held in London in April 1964. According to Lisson, "The aim of the Conference was to work out the practicability of economic sanctions and their implications on the economies of South Africa, the UK, the US and the Protectorates. Knowing that the strongest opposition to the application of sanctions came from the West (and within the West, Britain), the Committee made every effort to attract as wide and varied a number of speakers and participants as possible so that the Conference findings would be regarded as objective."

One probable type of action against South Africa was economic sanction. If UN affiliates broke fiscal and trading links with the country, it would make it more difficult for the apartheid government to uphold itself and its policies. Such sanctions were argued frequently within the UN, and many recognised and backed it as an effectual and non-violent way of applying force, but South Africa's major trading partners more voted against mandatory sanctions. In 1962, the UN General Assembly requested that its members split political, fiscal and transportation connections with South Africa. In 1968, it suggested the deferral of all cultural, didactic and sporting commerce as well. From 1964, the US and Britain discontinued their dealings of armaments to South Africa. In spite of the many cries for sanctions, however, none were made obligatory.

In 1964, Japan banned direct investment in South Africa, and later excluded South Africa from the 1964 Tokyo Olympics.

=== Arms ===
In 1977, the voluntary UN arms embargo became mandatory with the passing of United Nations Security Council Resolution 418.

However, the government collaborated extensively with the Pinochet regime in Chile in arms trading and intelligence sharing after Pinochet seized power in a coup in 1973, through the 1980s. Adriaan Vlok, then deputy minister for defence and of law and order, attended the Feria Internacional del Aire arms fair in Santiago, Chile, in 1986. A delegation from Armscor, the state-owned arms company, accompanied him. The South African Air Force's electronic warfare team visited Chile in March 1988 to examine a sophisticated electronic reconnaissance system developed by the Chilean Air Force, assisted by the United States, the CIA having supported the Pinochet coup. In this way Chile acted as a third party for the apartheid regime to acquire weapons that they would not otherwise have had access to.

The Chileans also provided Spanish translation services for the SADF in the war Namibia and Angola, in which Cuba was involved. Both countries shared strongly anti-communist views, and were opposing "Cuban-supported terrorism".

==== Other embargoes and disinvestment ====
An oil embargo was introduced on 20 November 1987 when the United Nations General Assembly adopted a voluntary international oil embargo.

While international opposition to apartheid grew, the Nordic countries, and Sweden in particular, provided both moral and financial support for the African National Congress (ANC). Pope John Paul II was an outspoken opponent of apartheid. In September 1988, he made a pilgrimage to countries bordering South Africa, while demonstratively avoiding South Africa itself. During his visit to Zimbabwe, he called for economic sanctions against the South African government. Other Western countries adopted a more ambivalent position at first. The Nixon administration implemented a policy known as the Tar Baby Option, pursuant to which the US maintained close relations with the apartheid government.

Disinvestment was also criticised on the basis its impact would harm ordinary black South Africans. British Prime Minister Margaret Thatcher described sanctions and disinvestment as "the way of poverty, starvation and destroying the hopes of the very people – all of them—whom you wish to help." Her stance may have been influenced by the views of her policy adviser, George Guise, who believed the economic damage inflicted by trade sanctions risked destabilising the country and causing a civil war. John Major, then Foreign Secretary under Thatcher, said disinvestment would "feed white consciences outside South Africa, not black bellies within it". However, in 2013 he said that Thatcher's government had been wrong to oppose tougher sanctions against South Africa during the apartheid era. Thatcher and United States President Ronald Reagan favoured the "constructive engagement" policy with the apartheid government, the former vetoing the imposition of UN economic sanctions and the latter opposing pressure from Congress and his own party for tougher sanctions until his veto was overridden.

Many conservatives opposed the disinvestment campaign, accusing its advocates of hypocrisy for not also proposing that the same sanctions be leveled on either the Soviet Union or the People's Republic of China. Libertarian Murray Rothbard also opposed this policy, asserting that the most-direct adverse impact of the boycott would actually be felt by the black workers in that country, and the best way to remedy the problem of apartheid was by promoting trade and the growth of free market capitalism in South Africa. The Reagan administration evaded international sanctions and provided diplomatic support in international forums for the South African government.." U.S. government justification for supporting the Apartheid regime were publicly given as a belief in "free trade" and the perception of the anti-communist South African government as a bastion against Marxist forces in Southern Africa, for example, by the military intervention of South Africa in the Angolan Civil War in support of right-wing insurgents fighting to topple the government. The American Legislative Exchange Council (ALEC), a conservative lobbying organisation, actively campaigned against divesting from South Africa throughout the 1980s.

While disinvestment, boycotts, and sanctions aimed at the removal of the apartheid system, there was also considerable opposition from within the anti-apartheid movement within South Africa coming from both black and white leaders. Mangosuthu Buthelezi, Chief Minister of KwaZulu and president of the Inkatha Freedom Party slammed sanctions, stating that "They can only harm all the people of Southern Africa. They can only lead to more hardships, particularly for the blacks." Well known anti-apartheid opposition MPs Helen Suzman and Harry Schwarz also strongly opposed moves to disinvest from South Africa. Both politicians of the Progressive Federal Party, they argued that disinvestment would cause further economic hardships for black people, which would ultimately worsen the political climate for negotiations. Suzman described them as "self defeating, wrecking the economy and do not assist anybody irrespective of race". Schwarz also argued that "Morality is cheap when someone else is paying." Contrary to this, sanctions were strongly favored by the ANC and by Nelson Mandela. The views of the conservative Inkatha Freedom Party and of white minority anti-apartheid activists was not reflected by large sections of both the internal and international anti-apartheid movements and its influence on the subsequent abolishment is still debated. Worth to note is that the use of sanctions have risen sharply since the end of the Cold War, and some studies seem to indicate at least a mild to moderate effectiveness.

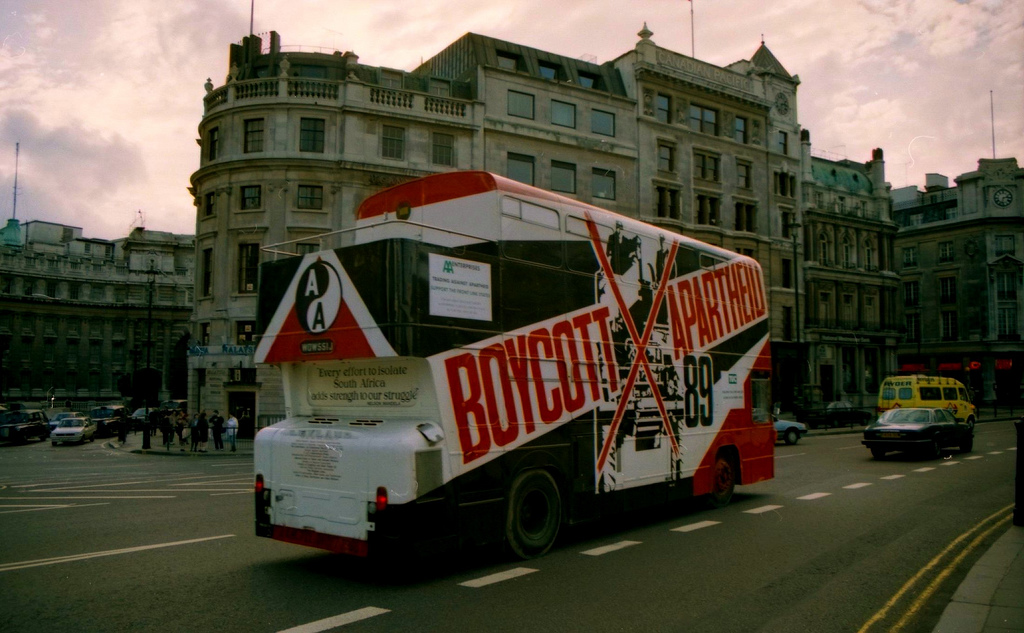
London bus in 1989 carrying the "Boycott Apartheid" message.

By the late-1980s, with no sign of a political resolution in South Africa, Western patience began to run out. By 1989, a bipartisan Republican and Democratic initiative in the US favoured economic sanctions (realised as the Comprehensive Anti-Apartheid Act of 1986), the release of Nelson Mandela and a negotiated settlement involving the ANC. Thatcher too began to take a similar line, but insisted on the suspension of the ANC's armed struggle.

By this time, after much debate, the United States, the United Kingdom, and 23 other nations had passed laws placing various trade sanctions on South Africa. A disinvestment from South Africa movement in many countries was similarly widespread, with individual cities and provinces around the world implementing various laws and local regulations forbidding registered corporations under their jurisdiction from doing business with South African firms, factories, or banks. The UK's significant economic involvement in South Africa may have provided some leverage with the South African government, with both the UK and the US applying pressure and pushing for negotiations. However, neither the UK nor the US was willing to apply economic pressure upon their multinationals in South Africa, such as the mining company Anglo American. The effect of Western influence in the anti-apartheid movement and specifically US/UK economic and political considerations in refusing many sanctions until the late 80s is still a debated topic.

== Economic effects ==
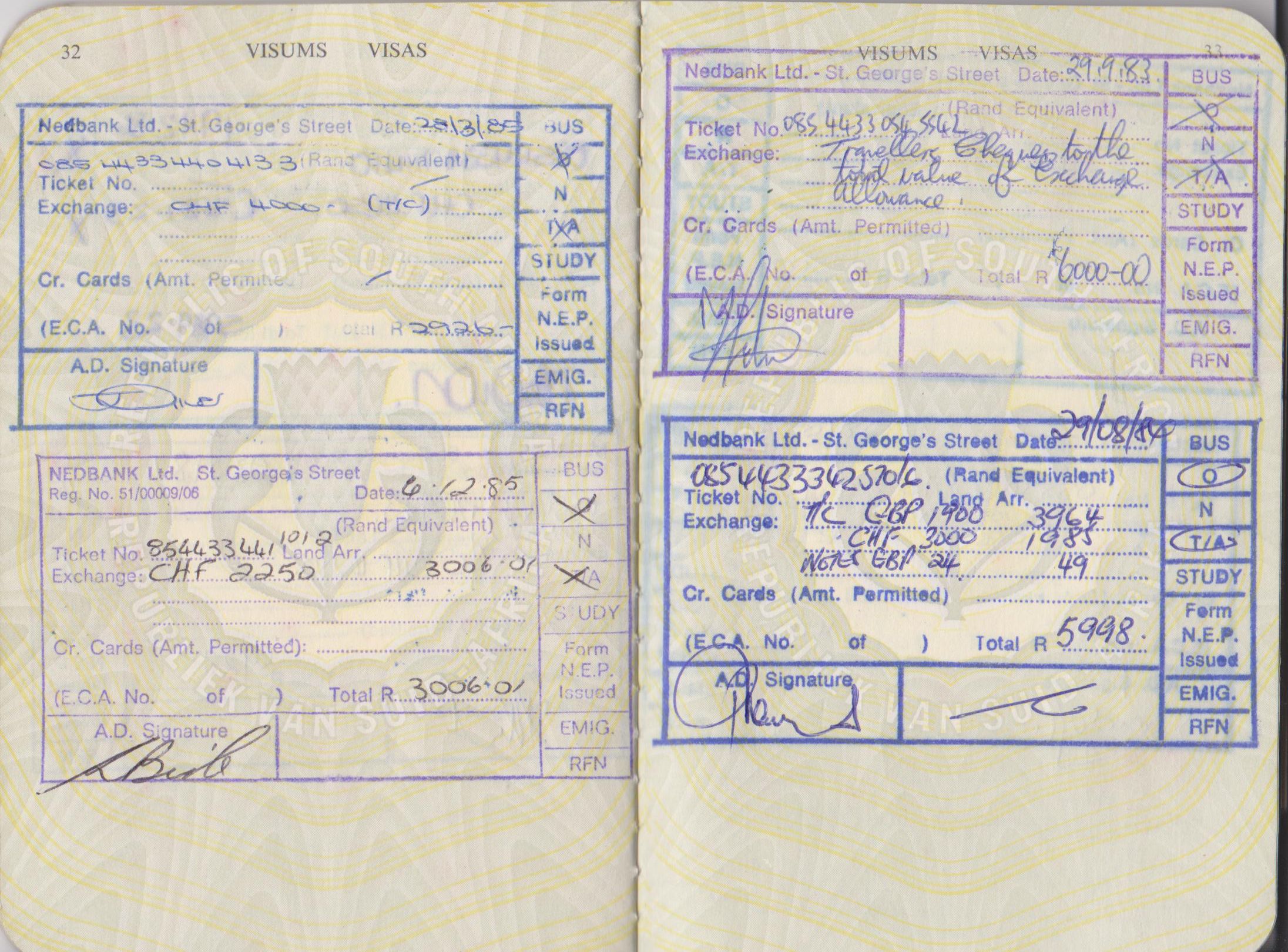
Four exchange controls stamps in a South African passport from the mid-1980s allowing the passport holder to take a particular amount of currency out of the country. Exchange controls such as these were imposed by the South African government to restrict the outflow of capital from the country.

While post-colonial African countries had already imposed sanctions on South Africa in solidarity with the Defiance Campaign, these measures had little effect because of the relatively small economies of those involved. The disinvestment campaign only impacted South Africa after the major Western nations, including the United States, got involved beginning in mid-1984. From 1984 onwards, according to Knight, because of the disinvestment campaign and the repayment of foreign loans, South Africa experienced considerable capital flight. The net capital movement out of South Africa was:

- R9.2 billion in 1985
- R6.1 billion in 1986
- R3.1 billion in 1987
- R5.5 billion in 1988

The capital flight triggered a dramatic decline in the international exchange rate of the South African currency, the rand. The currency decline made imports more expensive which in turn caused inflation in South Africa to rise at a very steep 12–15% per year.

The South African government did attempt to restrict the damaging outflow of capital. Knight writes that "in September 1985 it imposed a system of exchange control and a debt repayments standstill. Under exchange control, South African residents are generally prohibited from removing capital from the country and foreign investors can only remove investments via the financial rand, which is traded at a 20% to 40% discount compared to the commercial rand. This means companies that disinvest get significantly fewer dollars for the capital they withdraw."

== Aftermath ==
The imposition of international sanctions on the country began economic pressure that saw the unravelling of apartheid. There were oil sanctions but South Africa continued to be able to buy oil on international markets and developed technology that allowed the conversion of coal into oil. A small gas field was discovered off the coast of the Cape. The most damaging isolation was the denial of investment funds and the boycott of South African investments particularly by influential universities and foundations in the United States. These boycotts limited the capital available to South African businesses. During the 1980s gold reached its highest price as a result of international tensions reaping huge profits for the mining company conglomerates. However, because of currency restrictions and bans on the sales of Krugerrands in some countries, they were unable to invest abroad. The result was that they used their surplus funds to buy up businesses in virtually every activity in the economy. However, the financial benefit for the mining companies of continuing to support the system eroded as international capital stopped flowing into the country.

In 1990 the president Frederik Willem (F.W.) de Klerk recognised the economic unsustainability of the burden of international sanctions and released Nelson Mandela the nationalist leader and unbanned the African National Congress (ANC) that Mandela led.

In April 1991, the European Economic Community (EEC) lifted economic sanctions on South Africa.

Although there were some fears that the country could become unmanageable because of tribal conflict, or even a military take over by the white-dominated armed forces, de Klerk and Mandela guided the country to democratic elections in 1994 with Mandela as president. Despite socialist rhetoric and support from socialist countries in its early years the ANC maintained the mixed economy and encouraged the market economy including relaxing foreign exchange controls.

In 1993, Time magazine asked Nelson Mandela if economic sanctions helped to bring an end to the apartheid system. Mandela replied "Oh, there is no doubt."

== See also ==
- Anti-Apartheid Movement
- Anti-Apartheid movement in the United States
- Comprehensive Anti-Apartheid Act
- Disinvestment from South Africa
- Foreign relations of South Africa during apartheid
- History of South Africa (1948–1994)
- International sanctions during the Russo-Ukrainian War
- International sanctions during the 2022 Russian invasion of Ukraine
- International sanctions during the Venezuelan crisis
- Sanctions against Iran
- Sanctions against Syria
- Sporting boycott of South Africa during the apartheid era
- International sanctions against North Korea
- Boycott, Divestment and Sanctions
