= Free South Africa Movement =

The Free South Africa Movement (FSAM) was a coalition of individuals, organizations, students, and unions across the United States of America who sought to end Apartheid in South Africa. With local branches throughout the country, it was the primary anti-Apartheid movement in the United States. Famous artists also got involved including Keith Haring who handed out over 20,000 'Free South Africa' posters.

== Formation ==
The movement began on 21 November 1984 when Randall Robinson, executive director of TransAfrica, Mary Frances Berry, Commissioner of the United States Commission on Civil Rights, D.C. Congressman Walter Fauntroy, and Georgetown University law professor Eleanor Holmes Norton met with South African Ambassador Bernardus Gerhardus Fourie at his embassy to highlight human rights abuses in South Africa. They demanded the release of political prisoners and refused to leave the embassy by staging a sit-in, which led to the arrest of Robinson, Fauntroy and Berry. Norton was not arrested because she was addressing the media outside of the embassy, which had been notified beforehand. The sit-in was planned for Thanksgiving Eve to ensure wide press coverage. Thereafter, Trans-Africa organized daily protests outside the embassy. These protests helped create the FSAM.

Robinson's organization, TransAfrica, was a founding member of FSAM and played a key role in its development. As a coalition of unionists and anti-apartheid groups, the organization protested in front of the South African Embassy, leading to 5,000 Americans being arrested. The FSAM had three major objectives: (1) build awareness among the American general public of apartheid through a strategy of civil disobedience and demonstrations that elicited media coverage, (2) begin a change in the U.S. policy of constructive engagement toward South Africa, and (3) influence other Western countries to follow suit once American policy has changed.

== Anti-Apartheid protests ==
After the formation of FSAM, demonstrations at South African consulates continued. Following the demonstration at the South African Embassy, universities across the country mobilized anti-apartheid protests. "Black Student Movement" protests occurred in both historically black colleges and universities and majority-white institutions, including Ohio State University and George Washington University. Within one year, more than 4,500 arrests followed, and local branches of FSAM formed in cities across the country.

== Significance ==
The combined leadership of FSAM, TransAfrica and the Congressional Black Caucus together with the commitment of private citizens around the country led to the passage of the Comprehensive Anti-Apartheid Act. Many European countries followed suit by enacting their own sanctions. FSAM is arguably the most important and successful initiative undertaken by black private citizens since the Civil Rights movement. It expanded the influence of African Americans in forming US.. foreign policy.

== See also ==
- Anti-Apartheid movement in the United States
