= Nicole Lee =

Nicole Lee may refer to:

- Nicole Lee (lawyer)
- Nicole Lee (politician)
