= United Nations General Assembly Resolution 1761 (XVII) =

1962 resolution passed by the United Nations

United Nations General Assembly Resolution 1761 was passed on 6 November 1962 in response to the racist policies of apartheid established by the South African Government.

== Condemnation of apartheid ==
The resolution deemed apartheid and the policies enforcing it to be a violation of South Africa's obligations under the UN Charter and a threat to international peace and security.

== Call for a voluntary boycott ==
Additionally, the resolution requested Member States to break off diplomatic relations with South Africa, to cease trading with South Africa (arms exports in particular), and to deny passage to South African ships and aircraft.

== Establishment of the UN Special Committee on Apartheid ==
The resolution also established the United Nations Special Committee against Apartheid. The committee was originally boycotted by the Western nations, because of their disagreement with the aspects of the resolution calling for the boycott of South Africa. Even so, the committee found allies in the West, such as the British-based Anti-Apartheid Movement, through which it could work and lay the ground roots for the eventual acceptance by the Western powers of the need to impose economic sanctions on South Africa to pressure for political changes.

== See also ==
- Anti-Apartheid Movement
- Disinvestment from South Africa
- International sanctions during apartheid
