= Congressional Black Caucus =

Caucus comprising most black members of the U.S. Congress

- Chair: Yvette Clarke (NY–9)
- Founder: 13 founding members: Shirley Chisholm (NY–12); Bill Clay (MO–1); George W. Collins (IL–6); John Conyers (MI–1); Ron Dellums (CA–7); Charles Diggs (MI–13); Walter Fauntroy (DC–AL); Augustus Hawkins (CA–21); Ralph Metcalfe (IL–1); Parren Mitchell (MD–7); Robert N. C. Nix Sr. (PA–2); Charles Rangel (NY–18); Louis Stokes (OH–21)
- Founded: January 4, 1969 (as Democratic Select Committee); March 30, 1971; 55 years ago
- Headquarters: Washington, D.C.
- International affiliation: Congressional Black Caucus Foundation
- Colors: red, black, and blue
- Seats in the House: 54 / 435 (plus 2 non-voting)
- Seats in the Senate: 4 / 100
- Seats in the House Democratic Caucus: 54 / 214
- Seats in House Republican Conference: 0 / 219
- Predecessor: Democratic Select Committee (DSC)

Website
- cbc.house.gov

The Congressional Black Caucus (CBC) is made up of Black members of the United States Congress. Although as of 2026 all members belong to the Democratic Party, the CBC founders envisioned it as a non-partisan organization, and there have been several instances of bipartisan collaboration with Republicans.

== History ==
=== Founding ===
The predecessor to the caucus was founded in January 1969 as the Democratic Select Committee by a group of black members of the House of Representatives, including Charles Diggs of Michigan, Shirley Chisholm of New York, Louis Stokes of Ohio, and Bill Clay of Missouri. As a result of Congressional redistricting and the Civil Rights Movement of the 1960s, more black representatives were elected to the House (increasing from nine to thirteen), encouraging them to establish a formal organization. Diggs, who is acknowledged that to have proposed the Democratic Select Committee, would serve as its chairman from 1969 to 1971.

During a meeting between committee members on February 2, 1971, a motion put forward by Clay to transform the Democratic Select Committee into a formal, non-partisan caucus for African American U.S. Congress members was accepted. During the same meeting, the organization, on the motion of Charles Rangel of New York, then changed its name to the Congressional Black Caucus. The thirteen founding members of the caucus were Shirley Chisholm, Bill Clay, George W. Collins, John Conyers, Ron Dellums, Charles Diggs, Augustus Hawkins, Ralph Metcalfe, Parren Mitchell, Robert N. C. Nix Sr., Charles Rangel, Louis Stokes, and Washington, D.C., delegate Walter Fauntroy. Diggs served as its first chairman from 1971 to 1972. Chisholm referred to the group as "unbought and unbossed". Five founding members of the CBC were also members of Prince Hall Freemasonry, an African-American branch of Freemasonry that became involved in civil rights: Stokes, Conyers, Rangel, Hawkins and Metcalfe.

President Richard Nixon refused to meet with the newly formed group, leading the CBC to boycott the 1971 State of the Union address. After their first joint press conference, Nixon finally met with the CBC on March 25, 1971. The Caucus presented the President with a 32-page document including "recommendations to eradicate racism, provide quality housing for black families, and promote the full engagement of blacks in government". All the members of the caucus were included on the master list of Nixon political opponents.

On June 5, 1972, shortly before the 1972 Democratic National Convention nominated George McGovern for president, the CBC released two documents: the Black Declaration of Independence and the Black Bill of Rights. Louis Stokes read a preamble and both documents into the record of the House of Representatives. The Black Bill of Rights includes sections on jobs and the economy, foreign policy, education, housing, public health, minority enterprise, drugs, prison reform, black representation in government, civil rights, voting rights in the District of Columbia, and the military. These documents were inspired by the National Black Political Convention and its own manifesto, The Gary Declaration: Black Politics at the Crossroads (also called the Black Agenda).

In 1976, Yvonne Brathwaite Burke became the first woman to chair the Congressional Black Caucus.

=== TransAfrica and Free South Africa Movement ===
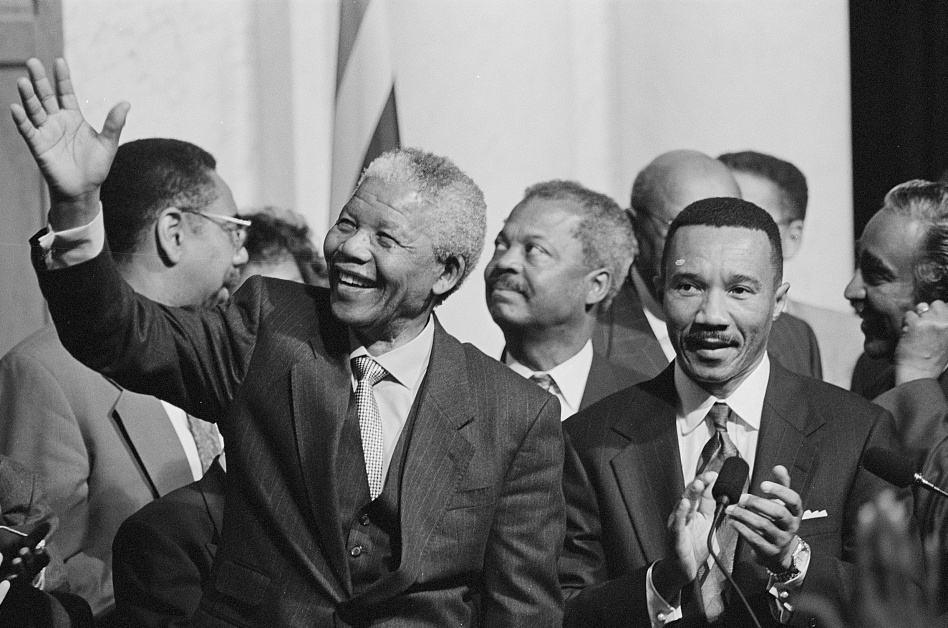
South African president Nelson Mandela with members of the Congressional Black Caucus, including Representative Kweisi Mfume, at an event at the Library of Congress

In 1977, the organization was involved in the founding of TransAfrica, an education and advocacy affiliate that was formed to act as a resource on information on the African continent and its Diaspora. They worked closely with this organization to start the national anti-apartheid movement in the US, Free South Africa Movement (characterized by sit-ins, student protests, it became the longest-lasting civil disobedience movement in U.S. history) and to devise the legislative strategy for the Comprehensive Anti-Apartheid Act of 1986 that was subsequently passed over Ronald Reagan's veto.

=== Funding ===
In late 1994, after Republicans attained a majority in the House, the House passed House Resolution 6 on January 4, 1995, which prohibited “the establishment or continuation of any legislative service organization..." This decision was aimed at 28 organizations, which received taxpayer funding and occupied offices at the Capitol, including the CBC. Then-chairman Kweisi Mfume protested the decision. The CBC reconstituted as a Congressional Member Organization.

=== Events ===
The caucus is sometimes invited to the White House to meet with the president. It requests such a meeting at the beginning of each Congress.

During the 2020 George Floyd protests, the CBC provided House members with stoles made from kente to be worn for an 8:46-long moment of silence before introducing the Justice in Policing Act of 2020.

== Goals ==
The caucus describes its goals as "positively influencing the course of events pertinent to African Americans and others of similar experience and situation", and "achieving greater equity for persons of African descent in the design and content of domestic and international programs and services."

The CBC encapsulates these goals in the following priorities: closing the achievement and opportunity gaps in education, assuring quality health care for every American, focusing on employment and economic security, ensuring justice for all, retirement security for all Americans, increasing welfare funds, and increasing equity in foreign policy.

Representative Eddie Bernice Johnson (D–TX), has said:

The Congressional Black Caucus is one of the world's most esteemed bodies, with a history of positive activism unparalleled in our nation's history. Whether the issue is popular or unpopular, simple or complex, the CBC has fought for thirty years to protect the fundamentals of democracy. Its impact is recognized throughout the world. The Congressional Black Caucus is probably the closest group of legislators on the Hill. We work together almost incessantly, we are friends and, more importantly, a family of freedom fighters. Our diversity makes us stronger, and the expertise of all of our members has helped us be effective beyond our numbers.

Mark Anthony Neal, a professor of African-American studies and popular culture at Duke University, wrote a column in late 2008 that the Congressional Black Caucus and other African-American-centered organizations are still needed, and should take advantage of "the political will that Obama's campaign has generated."

=== Congressional Black Caucus PAC ===
The Congressional Black Caucus PAC is a political action committee founded as a political arm of the caucus, aiming "to increase the number of Black Members of the US Congress...support Non-Black Candidates who will champion the needs and interests of the Black Community" and increase the "participation of Black Americans in the political process". Gregory Meeks (D-NY-5) chairs the PAC. The CBCPAC is known for its moderate-lean. The PAC caused controversy when it backed incumbent Michael Capuano, a white man, over challenger Ayanna Pressley, a black woman who ultimately defeated him. Two years later, it backed Eliot Engel, a white incumbent, over Jamaal Bowman, a black challenger who went on to defeat him.

HuffPost reporters questioned how endorsements were made, noting that the executive board included corporate lobbyists over CBC members. Representative Brenda Lawrence (D-MI-14) criticized the PAC's endorsement policies in 2020 and called for it to be reevaluated. Color of Change, a civil rights advocacy nonprofit group, released a letter in 2016 calling on the CBCPAC to cut ties with lobbyists from industries that are "notorious for the mistreatment and exploitation of Black people" including private prisons, pharmaceutical companies, student loan creditors, and big tobacco.

=== Congressional Black Caucus Foundation ===
Started in 1976, the CBC Foundation is a 501(c)(3) organization dedicated to policy research.

=== Congressional Black Caucus Institute ===
Started in 2000, the CBC Institute is a 501(c)(4) organization dedicated to civic participation, political leadership development, and economic empowerment.

== Membership ==
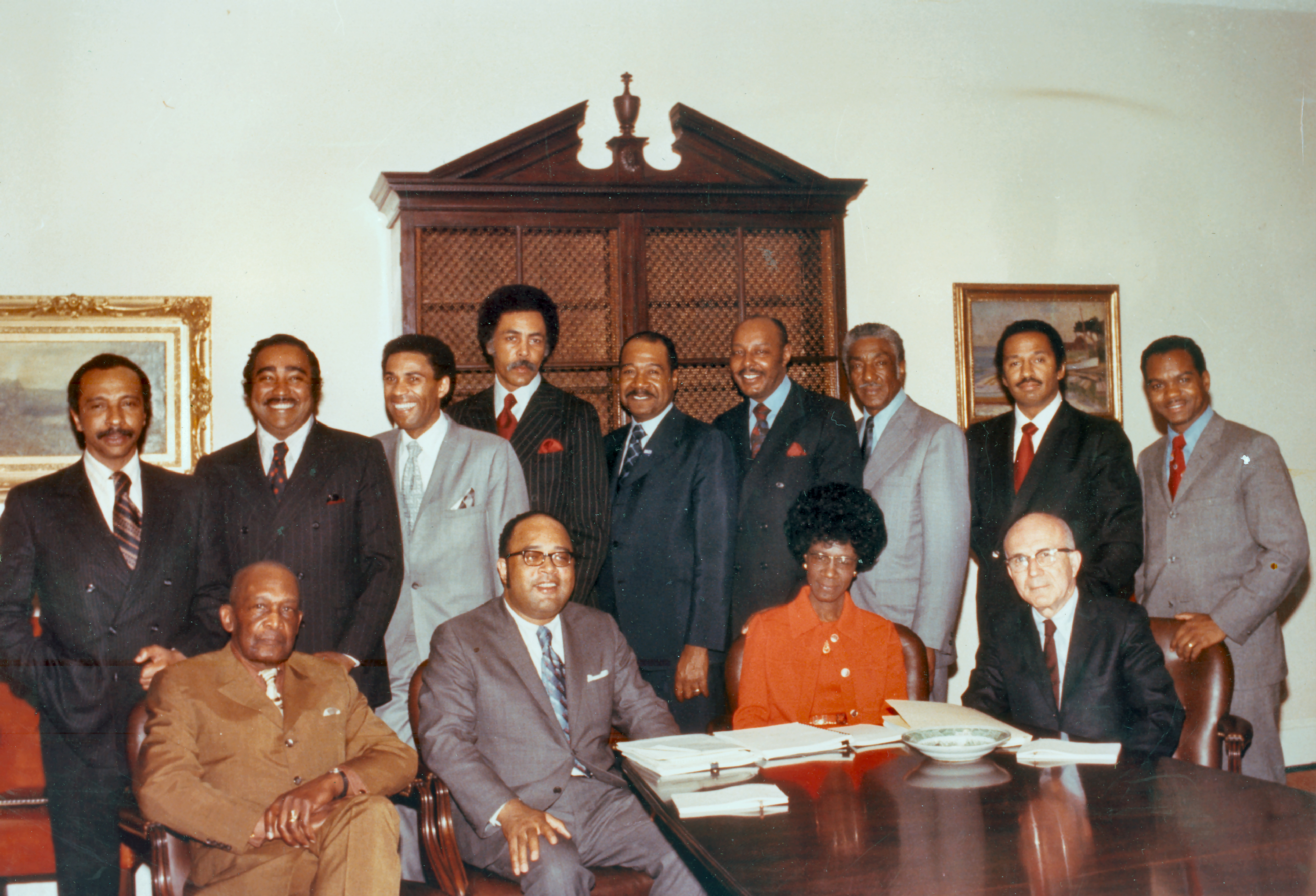
The 13 founding members of the Congressional Black Caucus (CBC) List: Shirley Chisholm (from New York's 12th district); Bill Clay (from Missouri's 1st district); George W. Collins (from Illinois's 6th district); John Conyers (from Michigan's 1st district); Ron Dellums (from California's 7th district); Charles Diggs (from Michigan's 13th district); Walter Fauntroy (from District of Columbia's at-large district); Augustus F. Hawkins (from California's 21st district); Ralph Metcalfe (from Illinois's 1st district); Parren Mitchell (from Maryland's 7th district); Robert N.C. Nix Sr. (from Pennsylvania's 2nd district); Charles Rangel (from New York's 18th district); Louis Stokes (from Ohio's 21st district)

The caucus has grown steadily as more black members have been elected. At its formal founding in 1971, the caucus had thirteen members. As of 2023, it had 55 members, including two who are non-voting members of the House, representing the District of Columbia and the U.S. Virgin Islands.

=== Senate members ===
As of 2025, there have been twelve black senators since the caucus's founding. The ten black U.S. senators, all Democrats, who are or have been members of the Congressional Black Caucus are Senator Angela Alsobrooks of Maryland, elected in 2024 (currently serving), Senator Lisa Blunt Rochester of Delaware, elected in 2024 (currently serving), Senator Cory Booker of New Jersey, elected in 2013 (currently serving), Senator Raphael Warnock of Georgia, elected in 2021 (currently serving), and Senator Kamala Harris of California, elected in 2016, who resigned in 2021 to take on the vice presidency; former senators Carol Moseley Braun (1993–1999), Barack Obama (2005–2008), and Roland Burris (2008–2010), all of Illinois; former senator Laphonza Butler (2023–2024) of California, and former senator Mo Cowan (2013) of Massachusetts.

Burris was appointed by Illinois governor Rod Blagojevich in December 2008 to fill Obama's seat for the remaining two years of his Senate term after Obama was elected president of the United States. Cowan was appointed to temporarily serve until a special election after John Kerry vacated his Senate seat to become U.S. secretary of state.

=== Black Republicans in the CBC ===
The caucus is officially non-partisan; but, in practice, the vast majority of Black politicians elected to Congress since the CBC's founding have been Democrats.

Twelve Black Republicans have been elected to Congress since the caucus was founded in 1971. Of those, only Delegate Melvin H. Evans of the Virgin Islands (1979–1981), Representative Gary Franks of Connecticut (1991–1997), Representative Allen West of Florida (2011–2013), and Representative Mia Love of Utah (2015–2019) joined the CBC.

Senator Edward Brooke, a Republican who represented Massachusetts in the 1960s and 1970s, was the only serving Black U.S. senator when the CBC was founded in 1971, but he never joined the group and sometimes clashed with its leaders. In 1979 Melvin H. Evans, a non-voting delegate from the Virgin Islands, became the first Republican member in the group's history. Gary Franks was the first voting Republican congressman to join in 1991, though he was at times excluded from CBC strategy sessions, skipped meetings, and threatened to quit the caucus.

J. C. Watts did not join the CBC when he entered Congress in 1995, and after Franks left Congress in 1997, no Republicans joined the CBC for fourteen years until Allen West joined the caucus in 2011, though fellow freshman congressman Tim Scott declined to join. After West was defeated for re-election, the CBC became a Democrat-only caucus once again in 2013.

In 2014, two black Republicans were elected to the House. Upon taking office, Will Hurd from Texas declined to join the caucus, while Mia Love from Utah, the first black Republican congresswoman, joined.

A map of congressional districts represented by Black representatives in the 118th Congress

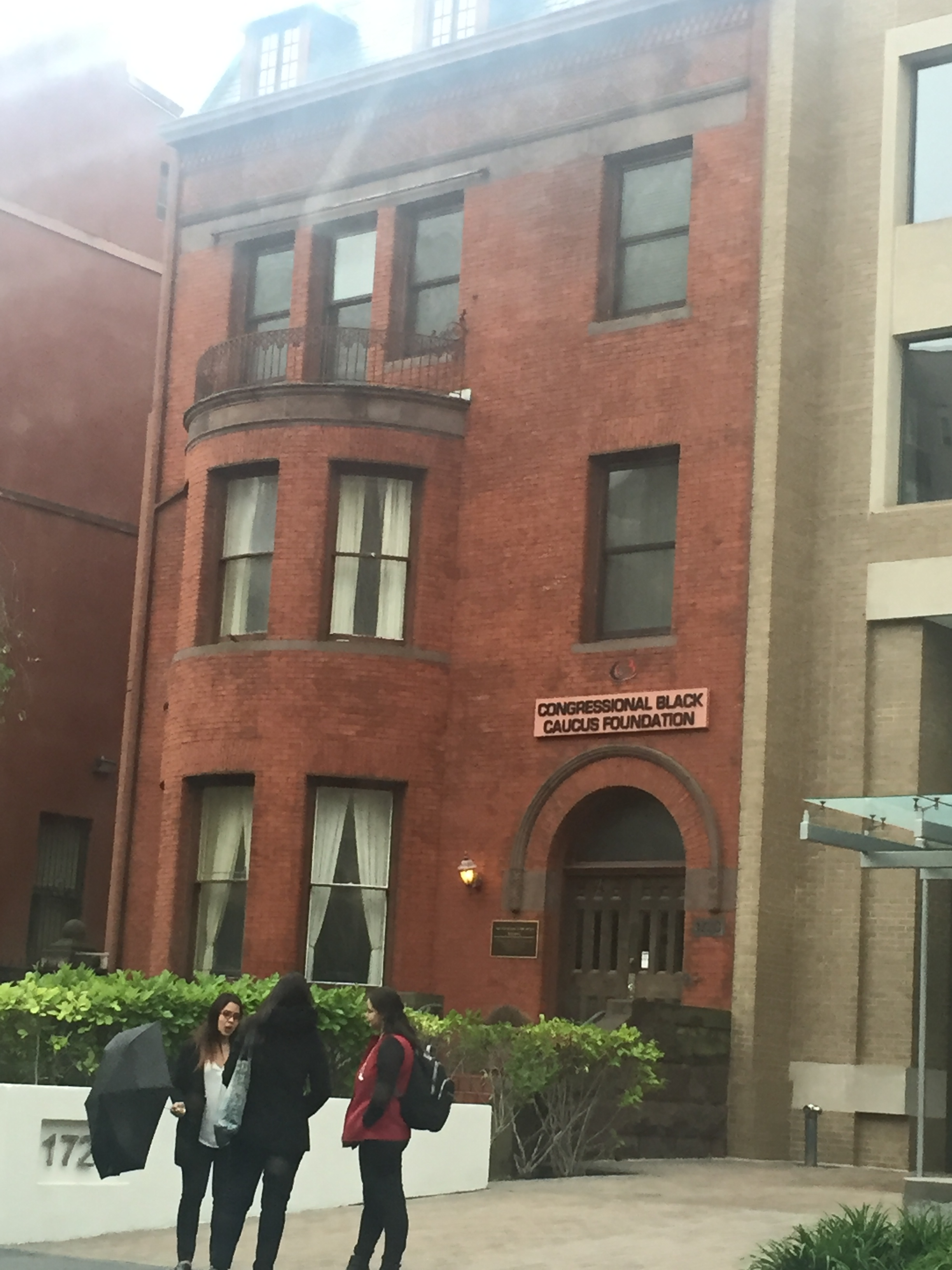
The Congressional Black Caucus Foundation

In 2021, newly elected black Republican Byron Donalds was blocked from joining the CBC.

=== Non-black membership ===
All past and present members of the caucus have been Black. In 2006, while running for Congress in a Tennessee district which is 60% black, Steve Cohen, who is white, pledged to apply for membership in order to represent his constituents. However, after his election, his application was refused. Although the bylaws of the caucus do not make race a prerequisite for membership, former and current members of the caucus agreed that the group should remain "exclusively black". In response to the decision, Cohen referred to his campaign promise as "a social faux pas" because "It's their caucus and they do things their way. You don't force your way in. You need to be invited."

Representative Lacy Clay, a Democrat from Missouri and the son of Representative Bill Clay, a co-founder of the caucus, said: "Mr. Cohen asked for admission, and he got his answer. He is white and the caucus is black. It is time to move on. We have racial policies to pursue and we are pursuing them, as Mr. Cohen has learned. It is an unwritten rule. It is understood." Clay also issued the following statement:

Quite simply, Representative Cohen will have to accept what the rest of the country will have to accept—there has been an unofficial Congressional White Caucus for over 200 years, and now it is our turn to say who can join 'the club.' He does not, and cannot, meet the membership criteria unless he can change his skin color. Primarily, we are concerned with the needs and concerns of the black population, and we will not allow white America to infringe on those objectives.

Later the same week, Representative Tom Tancredo, a Republican from Colorado, objected to the continued existence of the CBC as well as the Democratic Congressional Hispanic Caucus and the Republican Congressional Hispanic Conference, arguing that "It is utterly hypocritical for Congress to extol the virtues of a color-blind society while officially sanctioning caucuses that are based solely on race. If we are serious about achieving the goal of a colorblind society, Congress should lead by example and end these divisive, race-based caucuses."

=== Black Latino membership ===
Prior to 2017, no one had attempted to be in both the CBC and the Congressional Hispanic Caucus (CHC). In the 2016 House elections, Afro-Dominican State Senator Adriano Espaillat was elected to an open seat after twice trying to unseat CBC founder Charlie Rangel (who also has Puerto Rican ancestry) in the Democratic primary. Espaillat signaled that he wanted to join the CBC as well as the CHC, but was rebuffed by the CBC; it was insinuated that the cause was bad blood over the attempted primary challenges of Rangel.

In the 2018 elections, Afro-Latino Democrat Antonio Delgado was elected and joined the CBC, making no public effort to join the CHC. During the 2020 elections, Afro-Puerto Rican Democratic candidate Ritchie Torres published an op-ed claiming that he would not be able to join the CBC, a claim which was denied by then-CBC chair Karen Bass. After being elected to Congress, Torres successfully joined both the CBC and CHC.

== Chairs ==
The following U.S. representatives have chaired the Congressional Black Caucus:

Start	End	Chair	District
January 4, 1969	January 18, 1972	Charles Diggs	MI‑13
January 18, 1972	January 21, 1974	Louis Stokes	OH‑21
January 21, 1974	January 19, 1976	Charlie Rangel	NY‑19
January 19, 1976	January 3, 1977	Yvonne Burke	CA‑28
January 3, 1977	January 3, 1979	Parren Mitchell	MD‑7
January 3, 1979	January 3, 1981	Cardiss Collins	IL‑7
January 3, 1981	January 3, 1983	Walter Fauntroy	DC‑AL
January 3, 1983	January 3, 1985	Julian Dixon	CA‑28
January 3, 1985	January 3, 1987	Mickey Leland	TX‑18
January 3, 1987	January 3, 1989	Mervyn Dymally	CA‑31
January 3, 1989	January 3, 1991	Ron Dellums	CA‑8
January 3, 1991	January 3, 1993	Ed Towns	NY‑11
January 3, 1993	January 3, 1995	Kweisi Mfume	MD‑7
January 3, 1995	January 3, 1997	Don Payne	NJ‑10
January 3, 1997	January 3, 1999	Maxine Waters	CA‑35
January 3, 1999	January 3, 2001	Jim Clyburn	SC‑6
January 3, 2001	January 3, 2003	Eddie Bernice Johnson	TX‑30
January 3, 2003	January 3, 2005	Elijah Cummings	MD‑7
January 3, 2005	January 3, 2007	Mel Watt	NC‑12
January 3, 2007	January 3, 2009	Carolyn Kilpatrick	MI‑13
January 3, 2009	January 3, 2011	Barbara Lee	CA‑9
January 3, 2011	January 3, 2013	Emanuel Cleaver	MO‑5
January 3, 2013	January 3, 2015	Marcia Fudge	OH‑11
January 3, 2015	January 3, 2017	G. K. Butterfield	NC‑1
January 3, 2017	January 3, 2019	Cedric Richmond	LA‑2
January 3, 2019	January 3, 2021	Karen Bass	CA‑37
January 3, 2021	January 3, 2023	Joyce Beatty	OH‑3
January 3, 2023	January 3, 2025	Steven Horsford	NV‑4
January 3, 2025	January 3, 2027	Yvette Clarke	NY‑9
January 3, 2027	Designate	Troy Carter	LA‑2

== Current Leadership ==
- Chair: Yvette Clarke (NY-9, D)
- First vice-chair: Troy Carter (LA-2, D)
- Second vice-chair: Lucy McBath (GA-7, D)
- Whip: Sydney Kamlager-Dove (CA-37, D)
- Secretary: Marilyn Strickland (WA-10, D)

== Current members ==
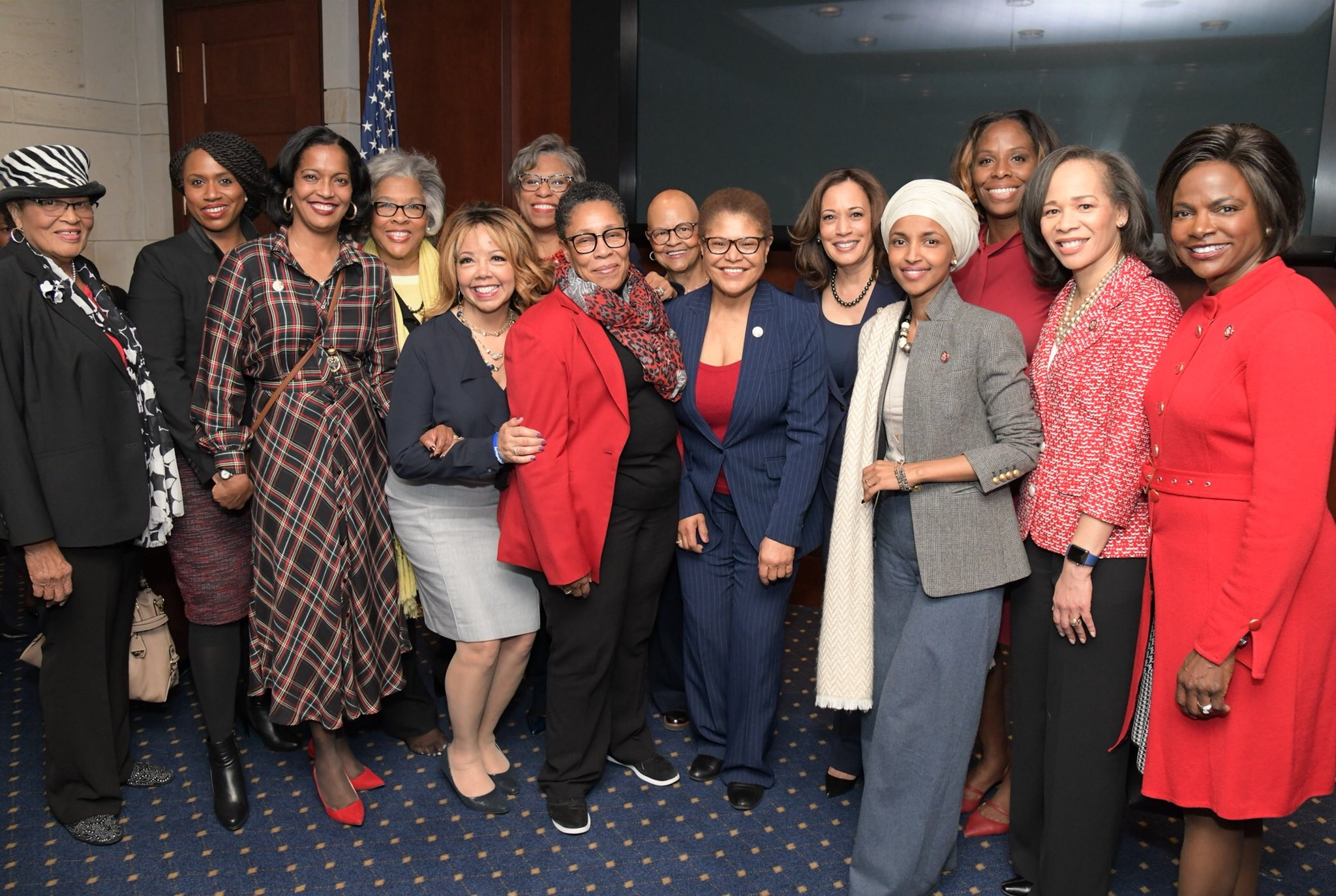
Congressional Black Caucus women 2019

Congressional Black Caucus in the 118th United States Congress

=== United States Senate ===
Delaware

- Lisa Blunt Rochester (D-DE)

Georgia

- Raphael Warnock (D-GA)

Maryland

- Angela Alsobrooks (D-MD)

New Jersey

- Cory Booker (D-NJ)

=== United States House of Representatives ===
Alabama

- Shomari Figures (D‑AL‑2, Mobile)
- Terri Sewell (D‑AL‑7, Birmingham)

California

- Lateefah Simon (D‑CA‑12, Emeryville)
- Sydney Kamlager-Dove (D‑CA‑37, Los Angeles)
- Maxine Waters (D‑CA‑43, Los Angeles)

Colorado

- Joe Neguse (D‑CO‑2, Lafayette)

Connecticut

- Jahana Hayes (D‑CT‑5, Wolcott)

District of Columbia

- Eleanor Holmes Norton (D‑DC‑AL, Washington)

Florida

- Maxwell Frost (D‑FL‑10, Orlando)
- Frederica Wilson (D‑FL‑24, Miami Gardens)

Georgia

- Sanford Bishop (D‑GA‑2, Albany)
- Hank Johnson (D‑GA‑4, Lithonia)
- Nikema Williams (D‑GA‑5, Atlanta)
- Lucy McBath (D‑GA‑7, Marietta)

Illinois

- Jonathan Jackson (D‑IL‑1, Chicago)
- Robin Kelly (D‑IL‑2, Matteson)
- Danny Davis (D‑IL‑7, Chicago)
- Lauren Underwood (D‑IL‑14, Naperville)

Indiana

- Andre Carson (D‑IN‑7, Indianapolis)

Louisiana

- Troy Carter (D‑LA‑2, New Orleans)
- Cleo Fields (D‑LA‑6, Baton Rouge)

Maryland

- Glenn Ivey (D‑MD‑4, Cheverly)
- Kweisi Mfume (D‑MD‑7, Baltimore)

Massachusetts

- Ayanna Pressley (D‑MA‑7, Boston)

Minnesota

- Ilhan Omar (D‑MN‑5, Minneapolis)

Mississippi

- Bennie Thompson (D‑MS‑2, Bolton)

Missouri

- Wesley Bell (D‑MO‑1, St. Louis)
- Emanuel Cleaver (D‑MO‑5, Kansas City)

Nevada

- Steven Horsford (D‑NV‑4, Las Vegas)

New Jersey

- Herb Conaway (D‑NJ‑3, Delran)
- LaMonica McIver (D‑NJ‑10, Newark)
- Bonnie Watson Coleman (D‑NJ‑12, Ewing Township)

New York

- Gregory Meeks (D‑NY‑5, Queens)
- Hakeem Jeffries (D‑NY‑8, Brooklyn)
- Yvette Clarke (D‑NY‑9, Brooklyn)
- Ritchie Torres (D‑NY‑15, Bronx)

North Carolina

- Don Davis (D‑NC‑1, Snow Hill)
- Valerie Foushee (D‑NC‑4, Chapel Hill)
- Alma Adams (D‑NC‑12, Charlotte)

Ohio

- Joyce Beatty (D‑OH‑3, Columbus)
- Shontel Brown (D‑OH‑11, Warrensville Heights)
- Emilia Sykes (D‑OH‑13, Akron)

Oregon

- Janelle Bynum (D‑OR‑5, Happy Valley)

Pennsylvania

- Dwight Evans (D‑PA‑2, Philadelphia)
- Summer Lee (D‑PA‑12, Pittsburgh)

Rhode Island

- Gabe Amo (D‑RI‑1, Providence)

South Carolina

- Jim Clyburn (D‑SC‑6, Columbia)

Texas

- Al Green (D‑TX‑9, Houston)
- Christian Menefee (D‑TX‑18, Houston)
- Jasmine Crockett (D‑TX‑30, Dallas)
- Marc Veasey (D‑TX‑33, Fort Worth)

Virginia

- Bobby Scott (D‑VA‑3, Newport News)
- Jennifer McClellan (D‑VA‑4, Richmond)

Washington

- Marilyn Strickland (D‑WA‑10, Tacoma)

Wisconsin

- Gwen Moore (D‑WI‑4, Milwaukee)

U.S. Virgin Islands

- Stacey Plaskett (D‑VI‑AL, St. Croix)

== Prominent former members ==
=== Presidents of the United States ===
- Barack Obama (D-US), 44th President of the United States (2009–2017), United States Senator from Illinois (2005–2008), and Member of the Illinois Senate from the 13th district (1997–2004).

=== Vice presidents of the United States ===
- Kamala Harris (D-US), 49th Vice President of the United States (2021–2025), United States Senator from California (2017–2021), 32nd Attorney General of California (2011–2017), and 27th District Attorney of San Francisco (2004–2011).

=== United States Senate ===
- Carol Moseley Braun (D-IL), United States Ambassador to New Zealand (1999–2001), United States Ambassador to Samoa (2000–2001), United States Senator from Illinois (1993–1999), Cook County Recorder of Deeds (1988–1999), and Member of the Illinois House of Representatives (1979–1988).
- Roland Burris (D-IL), United States Senator from Illinois (2009–2010), 39th Attorney General of Illinois (1991–1995), 3rd Comptroller of Illinois (1979–1991), and Director of the Illinois Department of Central Management Services (1973–1977).
- Mo Cowan (D-MA), United States Senator from Massachusetts (2013)

=== United States House of Representatives ===
- William Lacy Clay Jr. (D-MO), Member of the U.S. House of Representatives from Missouri's 1st district (2001–2021), Member of the Missouri Senate from the 4th district (1991–2001), and Member of the Missouri House of Representatives from the 59th district (1983–1991).
- John Conyers (D-MI), Member of the U.S. House of Representatives from Michigan (1965–2017), Dean of the United States House of Representatives (2015–2017), Chair of the House Judiciary Committee (2007–2011), and Chair of the House Oversight Committee (1989–1995).
- Elijah Cummings (D-MD), Member of the U.S. House of Representatives from Maryland's 7th district (1996–2019), Chair of the House Oversight Committee (2019), and Member of the Maryland House of Delegates from the 39th district (1983–1996).
- Marcia Fudge (D-OH), Secretary of Housing and Urban Development (2021–2024), Chair of the Congressional Black Caucus (2013–2015), Member of the U.S. House of Representatives from Ohio's 11th district (2008–2021), and Mayor of Warrensville Heights, Ohio (2000–2008).
- Alcee Hastings (D-FL), Member of the U.S. House of Representatives from Florida (1993–2021) and Judge of the United States District Court for the Southern District of Florida (1979–1989).
- Sheila Jackson Lee (D-TX), Member of the U.S. House of Representatives from Texas's 18th district (1995–2024) and Member of the Houston City Council from at-large post (1990–1995)
- John Lewis (D-GA), Member of the U.S. House of Representatives from Georgia's 5th district (1987–2020), Member of the Atlanta City Council from at-large post 18 (1982–1985), and 3rd Chairman of the Student Nonviolent Coordinating Committee (1963–1966)
- Charles Rangel (D-NY), Member of the U.S. House of Representatives from New York (1971–2017), Chair of the House Ways and Means Committee (2007–2010), and Member of the New York State Assembly from the 72nd district (1967–1970).
- Cedric Richmond (D-LA), Director of the Office of Public Engagement (2021–2022), Senior Advisor to the President (2021–2022), Member of the U.S. House of Representatives from Louisiana's 2nd district (2011–2021), Chair of the Congressional Black Caucus (2017–2019), and Member of the Louisiana House of Representatives from the 101st district (2000–2011).

== Congressional Caucus on Black Women and Girls ==
The Congressional Caucus on Black Women and Girls is a separate caucus of the United States Congress founded in 2016 to advance issues and legislation important to the welfare of women and girls of African descent.

== See also ==
- Congressional Black Caucus Foundation
- African Americans in the United States Congress
- Pan-African Congress

== Bibliography ==
- Singh, Robert (1998). The Congressional Black Caucus: Racial Politics in the U.S. Congress. Thousand Oaks, California: Sage.
