= Nicole Lee (lawyer) =

American human rights lawyer

Nicole Lee is an American human rights lawyer. She is an expert and activist in human rights issues. She is a former president of TransAfrica and is the first female president of the organisation. Prior to this role, she has worked as a human rights lawyer in Africa, the Caribbean and Latin America. She has testified before congress on policy issues concerning Africa, Latin America, and the Caribbean. She is also currently official liaison between the Nelson Mandela family and international media.

Lee was born in Buffalo, NY. After graduating with a master's of law degree from the University of Buffalo, she worked in Haiti for a human rights group, Bureau des Avocats Internationaux. She then worked with a human rights advocacy group, Global Justice. She joined TransAfrica as CFO in 2005 and is the current Executive Director of TransAfrica. She is married to Marc Bayard.

== TV appearances ==
She has appeared on 20/20, Anderson Cooper, NPR, Democracy Now!, and BBC television. Notable interviews are noted below:

- The Tavis Smiley Show, (June 28, 2013): Obama's Trip to Africa
- Democracy Now!,(November 7, 2007): US Militarization of Africa.
