= Constructive engagement =

Policy of the US Reagan administration

Constructive engagement was the name given to the conciliatory foreign policy of the Reagan administration towards the apartheid regime in South Africa. Devised by Chester Crocker, Reagan's assistant secretary of state for African affairs, the policy was promoted as an alternative to the economic sanctions and divestment from South Africa demanded by the UN General Assembly and the international anti-apartheid movement. Among other objectives, it sought to advance regional peace in Southern Africa by linking the end of South Africa's occupation of Namibia to the end of the Cuban presence in Angola.

The policy was in place between roughly 1981 and 1986, when, amid mounting international criticism of the South African regime, the United States Congress overrode President Ronald Reagan's veto to pass the Comprehensive Anti-Apartheid Act.

== Rationale ==
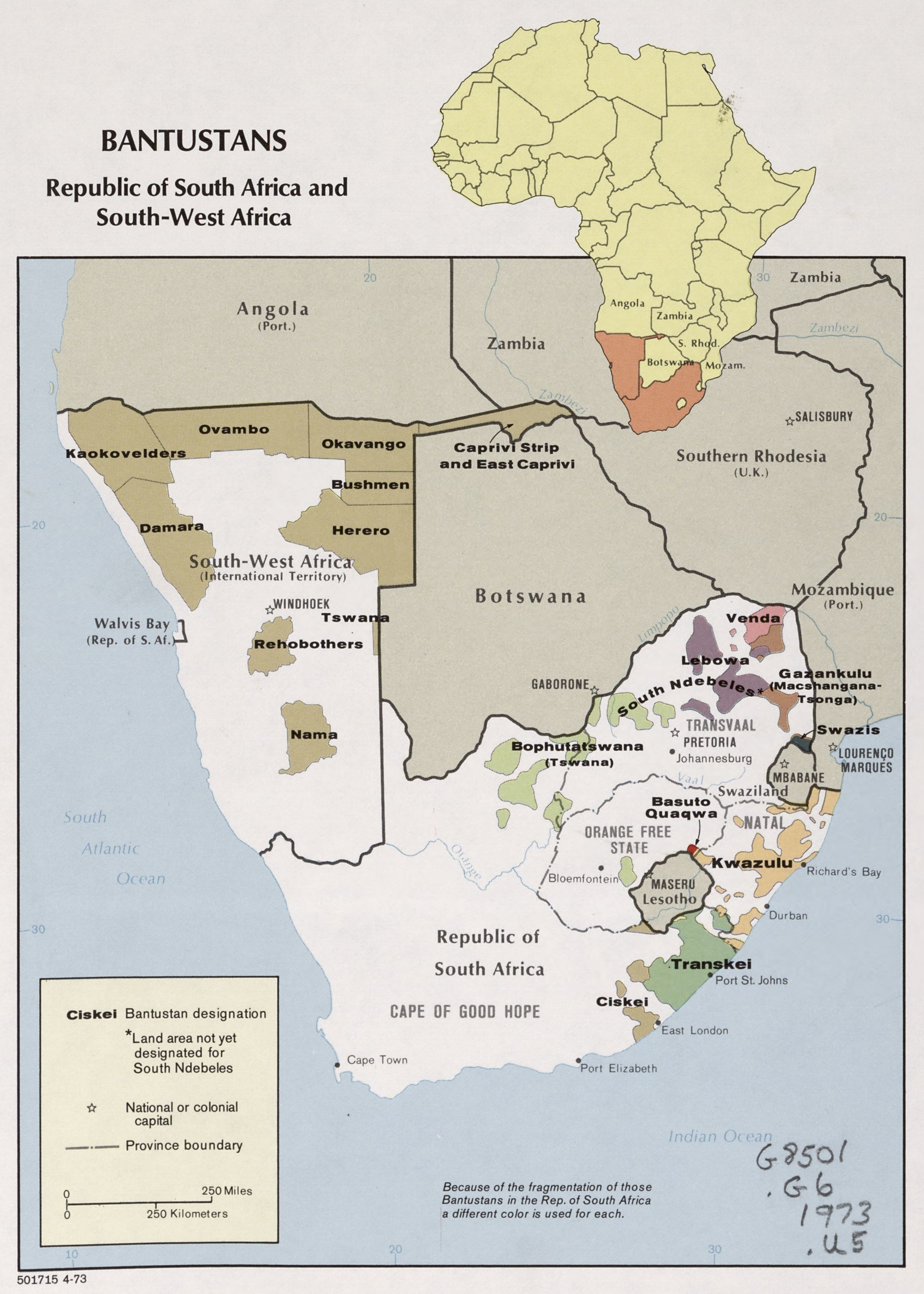
Southern Africa in 1973.

In 1981, Chester Crocker was appointed assistant secretary of state for African affairs, and announced that the U.S. would pursue with South Africa "a more constructive relationship . . . based on shared interests, persuasion, and improved communication". The constructive engagement policy originated in a piece published by Crocker in Foreign Affairs the previous year, while he was an adviser to Ronald Reagan's presidential campaign. In the piece, Crocker criticised the South Africa policy of Jimmy Carter's administration, which had involved overt and public pressure on Pretoria to move away from apartheid. He said this policy had had disappointing results. Instead, by building leverage with Pretoria and saving it "for genuine opportunities to exert influence", the U.S. could "steer between the twin dangers of abetting violence in the Republic [of South Africa] and aligning ourselves with the cause of white rule", and thereby could "underpromise and overdeliver".

Beyond this, however, constructive engagement was generally framed by its adherents as the policy governing the U.S.'s engagements with the entire Southern African region. The region had grown in its importance to the U.S.—and its Cold War programme of containment—as a result of the Cuban presence in Angola, where South Africa was pursuing putatively counter-communist objectives in both the Angolan Civil War and the Border War. The South African government redoubled its appeals to its own importance as a Western military partner and anti-communist bulwark in the region, while U.S. policymakers feared that political instability inside South Africa would create a regional power vacuum, opening the door to Soviet influence. At the same time, Crocker believed that a closer relationship with the South African government could create leverage to be expended on brokering peace across the region.

== Strategies ==
The policy of this Administration has been to foment change away from apartheid:

- By unambiguous public statements condemning apartheid evils;
- By reinforcing these views with quiet diplomacy;
- By working with elements within South Africa that share a vision of peace and equality;
- By encouraging fair employment practices for U.S. companies; and
- By including ourselves as a government in financing programs... to give South African blacks better training and educational opportunities.

— Deputy Secretary of State Kenneth Dam in a 1985 U.S. Senate hearing

=== South African political reform ===
Constructive engagement entailed "encouraging change in the apartheid system through a quiet dialogue with [South Africa's] white minority leaders"—that is, through private inducements and positive incentives, rather than through sanctions or public pressure. In an early speech, Reagan declared his support for the South African government, and his administration lifted prior restrictions on the export of military equipment to South Africa. Between 1981 and 1985, bilateral trade and investment grew, as did bilateral cooperation in other arenas. Indeed, Reagan's administration frequently used its veto powers to block punitive measures tabled in the United Nations (UN) Security Council or in the U.S. Congress. Instead, it welcomed and encouraged the limited domestic political reforms initiated by South African President P. W. Botha, including the 1983 Constitution.

=== Southern Africa and linkage ===
In the wider region—which on some accounts was Crocker's primary focus—the practice of constructive engagement turned on the so-called "linkage" strategy. Crocker sought to attain both Namibian independence and a Cuban withdrawal from Angola, precisely by linking the two outcomes: the end of South Africa's highly unpopular occupation of Namibia could be made conditional on Cuban withdrawal from Angola, which, in turn, could be framed as a reward to South Africa for its own withdrawal. These regional objectives were also linked to the U.S.'s improved bilateral relationship with South Africa: the U.S.'s conciliatory posture would encourage South African compliance with a regional peace programme, and, moreover, once achieved, the regional peace programme might provide more conducive conditions for domestic political reforms inside South Africa.

== End of the policy ==
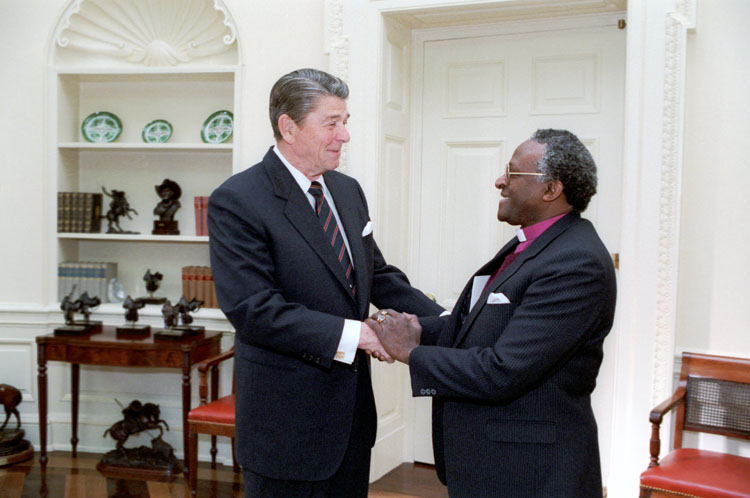
Desmond Tutu, a fierce critic of constructive engagement, met President Ronald Reagan in 1984.

The policy of constructive engagement, though it was echoed by the British government of Margaret Thatcher, came under criticism, as the South African government used increasingly repressive tactics against its black population and anti-apartheid activists. When South Africa's Archbishop Desmond Tutu visited the United States in 1984, in the aftermath of President Reagan's comfortable re-election, he said in a speech on Capitol Hill that, "constructive engagement is an abomination, an unmitigated disaster . . . Apartheid is as evil, as immoral, as un-Christian, in my view, as Nazism. And in my view, the Reagan administration's support and collaboration with it is equally immoral, evil, and totally un-Christian." In April 1985 President Reagan came under attack from within the Republican Party itself. The Republican majority in the Senate voted 89–4 on a resolution condemning apartheid. The four "no" votes came from Republican senators Jesse Helms, Barry Goldwater, Chic Hecht, and Steve Symms.

In October 1986, the United States Congress overrode President Reagan's veto of the Comprehensive Anti-Apartheid Act (the Senate vote was 78 to 21, and the House vote was 313 to 83). During the lead-up to the override, Reagan appointed Edward Perkins, who is black, ambassador to South Africa. Conservative representative Dick Cheney was opposed to the override, saying that Nelson Mandela was the head of an organisation that the State Department had deemed "terrorist." In the week leading up to the vote, President Reagan appealed to members of the Republican Party for support, but as Senator Lowell P. Weicker Jr. would state, "For this moment, at least, the president has become an irrelevancy to the ideals, heartfelt and spoken, of America." The legislation, which banned all new U.S. trade and investment in South Africa, also denied landing permission at U.S. airports to South African Airways flights. This legislation was seen as a catalyst for similar sanctions in Europe and Japan, and signalled the end of the constructive engagement policy.

== Assessments ==
The policy is widely viewed as having failed to achieve its aim of inducing the National Party to reform apartheid. In the early 1980s, the apartheid state grew more, not less, repressive. Furthermore, just as Carter's Non-Proliferation Act failed to prevent South Africa from building a nuclear bomb, Constructive Engagement attempted, but failed, to prevent expansion of the weapons program. According to one 1985 analysis by academics Peter Vale and Sanford J. Ungar:

Having been offered many carrots by the United States over a period of four-and-a-half years as incentives to institute meaningful reforms, the South African authorities had simply made a carrot stew and eaten it... Constructive engagement has not merely caused the United States to lose five valuable years when it might have influenced South Africa to begin negotiating a settlement of its unique and extraordinary racial problems. Many would argue that constructive engagement was a necessary step in the evolution of American attitudes toward South Africa, but the cost has been great. American policy has actually exacerbated the situation inside South Africa by encouraging and indulging the white regime's divide-and-rule tactics...

At the same time, U.S. adherence to constructive engagement is viewed as having marginalised and alienated moderate black activists inside South Africa, who were neglected by U.S. diplomacy, and as having antagonised other states in the region. Similarly, critics hold that U.S. concessions to Pretoria had little regional effect but to delay Namibian independence and regional peace. Journalist Christopher Hitchens, for example, blamed constructive engagement and "the fearlessly soft attitude displayed by Chester Crocker towards apartheid" for the ten-year delay in implementing United Nations Security Council Resolution 435:

Independence on these terms could have been won years ago if it were not for Crocker's procrastination and Reagan's attempt to change the subject to the presence of Cuban forces in Angola. Here again, the United States dogmatically extended diplomatic recognition to one side only – South Africa's. Here again, without 'neutral' mediators American policy would have deservedly become the victim of its own flagrant bias. An important participant was Bernt Carlsson, UN Commissioner for Namibia, who worked tirelessly for free elections in the colony and tried to isolate the racists diplomatically.

The value of the regional dimensions of constructive engagement, and particularly the linkage principle, are defended by some commentators, who argue that previous U.S. administrations had not recognised—as Crocker did—the extent to which regional conflicts were inter-connected. Crocker himself continued to defend the policy, and viewed it as instrumental in enabling the 1988 Tripartite Accord and moves towards negotiations to end apartheid.

== See also ==
- South Africa–United States relations
- Foreign relations of South Africa during apartheid
- Sullivan Principles

== Bibliography ==
- Baker, Pauline H. (1989). The United States and South Africa: The Reagan Years. Ford Foundation. ISBN 0-87124-129-3. OCLC 20849479.
- Bell, Coral (1989). The Reagan Paradox: American Foreign Policy in the 1980s. Edward Elgar. ISBN 185278203X.
- Clough, Michael (1985). "Beyond Constructive Engagement". Foreign Policy (61): 3–24. doi:10.2307/1148699. ISSN 0015-7228. JSTOR 1148699.
- Coker, Christopher (1986). The United States and South Africa, 1968–1985: Constructive Engagement and its Critics. Durham: Duke University Press. ISBN 0822306654.
- Crocker, Chester A. (1980). "South Africa: Strategy for Change". Foreign Affairs. 59 (2): 323–351. doi:10.2307/20040728. ISSN 0015-7120. JSTOR 20040728.
- Crocker, Chester A. (1989). "Southern Africa: Eight Years Later". Foreign Affairs. 68 (4): 144–164. doi:10.2307/20044114. ISSN 0015-7120. JSTOR 20044114.
- Culverson, Donald R. (1996). "The Politics of the Anti-Apartheid Movement in the United States, 1969-1986". Political Science Quarterly. 111 (1): 127–149. doi:10.2307/2151931. ISSN 0032-3195. JSTOR 2151931.
- Davies, J. E. (2007). Constructive Engagement?: Chester Crocker & American Policy in South Africa, Namibia & Angola. Ohio University Press. ISBN 9781847013057.
- Fatton, Robert (1984). "The Reagan Foreign Policy toward South Africa: The Ideology of the New Cold War". African Studies Review. 27 (1): 57–82. doi:10.2307/523950. ISSN 0002-0206. JSTOR 523950. S2CID 144878667.
- Kagan-Guthrie, Zachary (2009). "Chester Crocker and the South African Border War, 1981-1989: A Reappraisal of Linkage". Journal of Southern African Studies. 35 (1): 65–80. doi:10.1080/03057070802685569. ISSN 0305-7070. JSTOR 40283215. S2CID 154612023.
- Klotz, Audie (1995). "Norms Reconstituting Interests: Global Racial Equality and U.S. Sanctions Against South Africa". International Organization. 49 (3): 451–478. doi:10.1017/S0020818300033348. ISSN 0020-8183. JSTOR 2706905. S2CID 154490398.
- Klotz, Audie (1999). Norms in International Relations: The Struggle Against Apartheid. Cornell University Press. ISBN 978-1-5017-3165-5. OCLC 1053865453.
- Magumbane, Bernard (1982). "Constructive Engagement or Disingeneous Support for Apartheid". Issue: A Journal of Opinion. 12 (3/4): 8–10. doi:10.2307/1166711. ISSN 0047-1607. JSTOR 1166711.
- Manzo, Kate (1986). "U.S. South Africa Policy in the 1980s: Constructive Engagement and Beyond". Review of Policy Research. 6 (2): 212–221. doi:10.1111/j.1541-1338.1986.tb00687.x.
- Nesbitt, Francis Njubi (2004). Race for Sanctions: African Americans Against Apartheid, 1946–1994. Indiana University Press. ISBN 0-253-11068-8. OCLC 61479320.
- Rich, Paul (1988). "United States Containment Policy, South Africa and the Apartheid Dilemma". Review of International Studies. 14 (3): 179–194. doi:10.1017/S0260210500113257. ISSN 0260-2105. JSTOR 20097143. S2CID 144502914.
- Rotberg, Robert I. (1990). "Reagan Era in Africa". In Kyvig, David E. (ed.). Reagan and the World. New York: Greenwood Press. pp. 119–138. ISBN 0313273413.
- Shepherd, George W. (1984). "The United States' South Africa Policy: The Failure of "Constructive Engagement" and the Emergence of New Options". Africa Today. 31 (2): 15–35. ISSN 0001-9887. JSTOR 4186222.
- Thomson, Alex (1995). "Incomplete Engagement: Reagan's South Africa Policy Revisited". The Journal of Modern African Studies. 33 (1): 83–101. doi:10.1017/S0022278X00020863. ISSN 0022-278X. JSTOR 161547. S2CID 154591417.
- Toler, Deborah (1982). "Constructive Engagement: Reactionary Pragmatism at Its Best". Issue: A Journal of Opinion. 12 (3/4): 11–18. doi:10.2307/1166712. JSTOR 1166712.
- Ungar, Sanford J.; Vale, Peter (1985). "South Africa: Why Constructive Engagement Failed". Foreign Affairs. 64 (2): 234–258. doi:10.2307/20042571. ISSN 0015-7120. JSTOR 20042571.
