= TransAfrica =

American advocacy organization

- Formation: 1977
- Founder: Randall Robinson
- Type: human rights education and advocacy agency
- Region served: Working in Africa and Africa Diaspora countries, 13 active campaigns.
- Structure: Board of Directors, staff, members
- Leadership: Nicole Lee, Director
- Governance: Board of Directors, Danny Glover (Chair)
- Website: www.transafrica.org

TransAfrica (formerly TransAfrica Forum) is an advocacy organization in Washington, D.C. that seeks to influence the foreign policy of the United States concerning African and Caribbean countries and all African diaspora groups. It is a research, education, and advocacy center for activism related to social, economic and political conditions in Africa, the Caribbean, and Latin America and other parts of the African Diaspora. TransAfrica is the largest and oldest social justice organization in the U.S that focuses on the African world. It has served as a major research, educational, and organizing institution for the African and African descendant communities and for the U.S. public in general.

== Mission ==
TransAfrica Forum is a research, education, and advocacy center dedicated to global justice for the African World. TransAfrica envisions a world where Africans and people of African descent are self-reliant, socially and economically prosperous, and have equal access to a more just international system that strengthens independence and democracy.

TransAfrica is an educational and organizing center that encourages human interest viewpoints in the U.S. foreign policy arena, and that advocates for justice for the people of Africa and the African Diaspora. TransAfrica creates solidarity between Americans and communities most affected by U.S. policies throughout the world. TransAfrica supports human rights, gender equity, democracy, and sustainable economic and environmental development.

TransAfrica advocates for a more just foreign policy through the engagement of African Americans and policymakers.

By connecting people and policymakers to those most affected by U.S. foreign policy, and by encouraging Afro-descendants to be civically active, TransAfrica works to create a more just foreign policy that reflects the values of African Americans, especially respect for human rights.

== History ==
The Black Forum on Foreign Affairs was formed in 1975, and served as the precursor to TransAfrica. TransAfrica Forum was founded on July 1, 1977, after being conceived a year earlier at a Black Leadership Conference convened by the Congressional Black Caucus in September, 1976. A committee consisting of Randall Robinson, Herschelle Challenor, and Willard Johnson are credited with formulating an organizational design and launch. Robinson became the organization's first Director.

TransAfrica launched a series of legislative campaigns and strategic media outreach that increased public awareness of South African apartheid and contributed to the global anti-apartheid solidarity movement. The organization is credited for its activist role in the anti-apartheid struggle. Through the Free South Africa Movement, TransAfrica initiated letter-writing campaigns, hunger strikes, and protest marches to challenge the apartheid system and compel the U.S. government to take action against apartheid.

=== Arthur R. Ashe Foreign Policy Library ===
Named after former board member Arthur Ashe, the Arthur R. Ashe Foreign Policy Library is the only library in the U.S. dedicated to sensitizing Americans about African, Caribbean, and Latin-American issues. It is an important resource for policy analysts, scholars and the public.

== Advocacy and education work ==
TransAfrica continues to work on similar social, political, and economic justice issues throughout the African world. The current priority areas in Africa include Democratic Republic of Congo, Egypt, Somalia, South Africa, South Sudan, Sudan, South Africa and Uganda. In the Americas, this includes Cuba, Haiti, Venezuela and the United States.

=== Advocacy and education events ===
TransAfrica continues to sponsor public seminars, community awareness campaigns and training programs to sensitize the public and policy makers. This includes the Cabral/Truth Circles, film series, lecture series, book club and a writer's forum for authors to discuss their work. They co-sponsor the annual New African Film Festival in Washington, D.C.

=== Free South Africa Movement ===
TransAfrica was a founding member of the Free South Africa Movement. It is a grassroots organization that was instrumental in taking the anti-apartheid movement in the U.S. to mainstream politics and lobbying for change. They were at the forefront of the sensitizing U.S. policy makers, students and the public about the anti-apartheid efforts in a strategic move.

On November 21, 1984, a day before the U.S. Thanksgiving holiday, Randall Robinson, Congressman Walter Fauntroy and Mary Frances Berry were arrested for a sit-in staged at the South African embassy. This brought the Anti-South African movements to the national stage. It sparked the formation of the Free South Africa Movement in the U.S. which TransAfrica was a founding member of. Within a few days, more sit-ins and demonstrations against South Africa were held nationally. Over 3,000 people were arrested by 1985. TransAfrica exposed the secret strategy meetings between the South African government and the Ronald Reagan administration. TransAfrica worked with the Congressional Black Caucus in formulating legislative strategy for the Comprehensive Anti-Apartheid Act of 1986. In May 2012, the organisation received the Mandela Freedom Statuette for "exceptional contribution to the struggle for the attainment for non-racial, free and democratic South Africa" from the South Africa government.

== Organization and structure ==
TransAfrica is run by a board of directors, administered by staff, and supported by members. Danny Glover served as chairman of the board. Past board members included activists Arthur Ashe, Chuck D and Harry Belafonte. The list of former Directors includes human rights lawyer Nicole Lee and labor activist Bill Fletcher Jr.

== See also ==
- Diaspora politics in the United States
- Ethnic interest groups in the United States
