= Financial rand =

ISO 4217
- Code: ZAL
- This infobox shows the latest status before this currency was rendered obsolete.

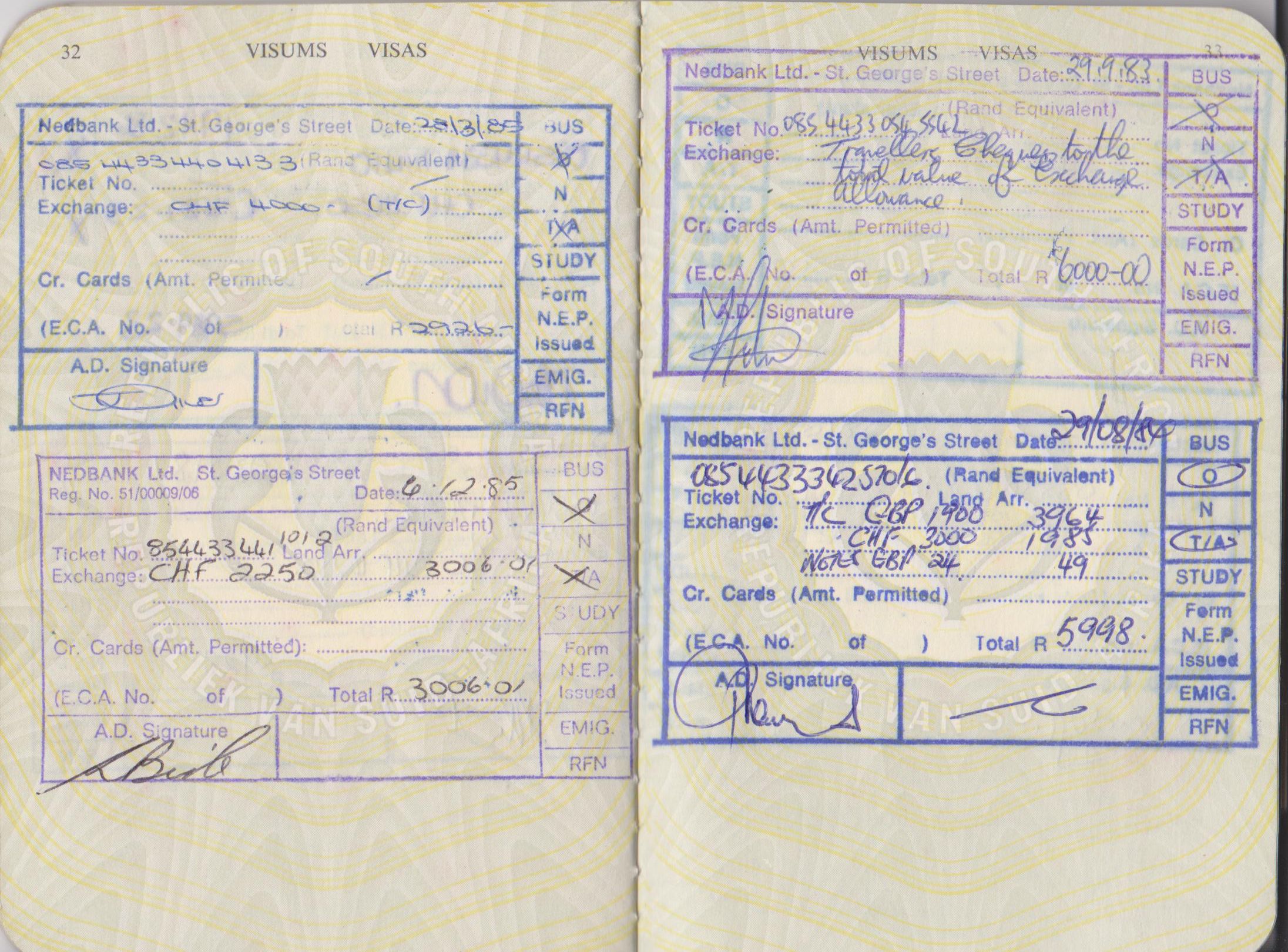
Four exchange control stamps in a South African passport from the mid-1980s allowing the passport holder to take a particular amount of currency out of the country. Exchange controls such as these were imposed by the South African government to restrict the outflow of capital from the country.

The South African financial rand was the most visible part of a system of capital controls. Although the financial rand was abolished in March 1995, some capital controls remain in place. These capital controls are locally referred to as "exchange controls", although the system has since 1995 moved towards surveillance — recording and reporting to the authorities of foreign currency transactions — rather than control.

Capital controls have been in place in South Africa in various guises on an uninterrupted basis since the outbreak of World War II, when Great Britain and its dominions implemented the Sterling area.

Following the 1960 Sharpeville massacre, South Africa experienced significant outflows of foreign exchange on the capital account of the balance of payments and instituted an additional level of capital controls, known as the Blocked Rand system. This had the principal effect of blocking outflows of capital to the other countries in the Sterling Area, notably Britain.

To some extent the Blocked Rand system mirrored Germany's Reichsbank system introduced under Hjalmar Schacht in 1937, called "aski" accounts — short for Ausländer Sonderkonten für Inlandszahlungen ("foreigners' special accounts for inland payments"). In other words, creating a closed loop system that did not create a claim on the foreign exchange reserves of the Third Reich, or in this case South Africa.

The report of the De Kock Commission on Exchange Controls tabled in November 1978, proposed a gradual easing of exchange controls. This saw the replacement of the Blocked Rand by the Financial Rand in early 1979. In line with this policy, the Financial Rand itself was abolished in 1983 and non-residents could repatriate the majority of their South African investments via the Commercial Rand.

This easing was, however, short-lived and the Financial Rand system was re-introduced on 1 September 1985. The outflows during 1984–1985 were largely the result of economic sanctions in response to apartheid. At the same time, the government enacted the exchange controls. Investments in South Africa by foreigners could only be sold for financial rand.

The financial rand system provided for two exchange rates for the rand — one for current account transactions and one for capital account transactions for non-residents. Investments made in South Africa by non-residents could only be sold for financial rand, and limitations were placed on the convertibility of financial rand into foreign currencies. Financial rand had the ISO 4217 currency code ZAL. Financial rand had a previous life, from January 1979 to February 1983. The 1985 crisis coincided with a default (then called a "standstill") on foreign debt by the apartheid government.
