= Comprehensive Anti-Apartheid Act =

U.S. sanctions against South Africa, 1986-93

Comprehensive Anti-Apartheid Act of 1986
- Long title: An Act to prohibit loans to, other investments in, and certain other activities with respect to, South Africa, and for other purposes.
- Nicknames: Anti-Apartheid Act of 1986
- Enacted by: the 98th United States Congress
- Effective: October 2, 1986

Citations
- Public law: 99-440
- Statutes at Large: 100 Stat. 1086

Codification
- Titles amended: 22 U.S.C.: Foreign Relations and Intercourse
- U.S.C. sections created: 22 U.S.C. ch. 60 § 5001 et seq.

Legislative history
- Introduced in the House as H.R. 4868 by William H. Gray III (D–PA) on May 21, 1986; Committee consideration by House Banking, Finance, and Urban Affairs, House Foreign Affairs, House Public Works and Transportation, House Ways and Means, House Rules; Passed the House on June 18, 1986 (voice vote); Passed the Senate on August 15, 1986 (84-14, in lieu of S. 2701) with amendment; House agreed to Senate amendment on September 12, 1986 (310-79); Vetoed by President Ronald Reagan on September 26, 1986; Overridden by the House on September 29, 1986 (315-84); Overridden by the Senate and became law on October 2, 1986 (78-21)

The Comprehensive Anti-Apartheid Act of 1986 was a law enacted by the United States Congress. The law imposed sanctions against South Africa and stated five preconditions for lifting the sanctions that would essentially end the system of apartheid, which the latter was under at the time. Most of the sanctions were repealed in July 1991, after South Africa took steps towards meeting the preconditions of the act, with the final vestiges of the act being repealed in November 1993.

== Legislative history ==
=== Initial introduction in 1972 ===
Sponsored by Senator William Roth, the CAAA was the first United States anti-apartheid legislation. The act was initiated by Congressman Ron Dellums in reaction to the plight of Black South Africans and demanded the end of apartheid. The legislation aimed to ban all new U.S. trade and investment in South Africa and would be a catalyst for similar sanctions in Europe and Japan. Direct air links were also banned, including South African Airways flights to U.S. airports. The act also required various U.S. departments and agencies to suppress funds and assistance to the then pro-apartheid government.

=== Initial attempt at passage in 1985 ===
Democrats in the Senate initially tried to pass the Anti-Apartheid Act in September 1985, but could not overcome a Republican filibuster. President Ronald Reagan viewed the act as an intrusion on his authority to conduct foreign policy (constructive engagement) and issued his own set of sanctions, but Democrats considered them to be "watered down and ineffective."

=== Passage in the House and Senate in 1986 ===
The bill was re-introduced in 1986 and brought up for a vote despite Republican efforts to block it to give Reagan's sanctions time to work. It initially passed unexpectedly in the House in June 1986 after Republicans agreed to a voice vote in the hope that the bill would die later on in the process, thus ending any possibility of sanctions. Reagan publicly opposed the bill. In August 1986, the Senate passed a version of the Anti-Apartheid Act with weaker sanctions by a veto-proof margin of 84–14. Democratic leaders in the House agreed to accept the weaker Senate version of the bill for it to have sufficient bipartisan support to override any attempt to veto.

=== Veto by President Reagan ===
Reagan vetoed the compromised bill on September 26, calling it "economic warfare" and alleging that it would mostly hurt the impoverished black majority and lead to more civil strife. He again offered to impose sanctions via executive order, while also working with Senate Republicans on concessions to avoid them overriding his veto. Reagan's veto was attacked harshly by anti-Apartheid leaders like Desmond Tutu who said Reagan would be "judged harshly by history". In the week leading up to the subsequent vote, President Reagan enlisted South African foreign minister Pik Botha to call Republicans on the fence, though this was seen to backfire.

=== Veto override ===
Republican Senator Richard Lugar (R–IN), then chair of the Foreign Relations Committee, led the charge to override the veto, turning against a president that he had typically supported. Despite denunciations from his fellow Republicans, Lugar declared on the Senate floor, "We are against tyranny, and tyranny is in South Africa!" Reagan's veto was eventually overridden by Congress (by the Senate 78 to 21, the House by 313 to 83) on October 2. In the House vote, taken on September 29, 1986, 232 Democrats and 81 Republicans voted to override the President's veto while 4 Democrats and 79 Republicans voted to sustain the President's veto. In the Senate vote, all 47 Democrats were joined by 31 Republicans to override the President's veto while 21 Republicans voted to sustain the President's veto. This override marked the first time in the twentieth century that a president had a foreign policy veto overridden. Apartheid opponents in the United States and South Africa applauded the vote, while critics argued that it would be either ineffectual or lead to more violence.

President Reagan made the following statement after the override:

Today's Senate vote should not be viewed as the final chapter in America's efforts, along with our allies, to address the plight of the people of South Africa. Instead, it underscores that America—and that means all of us—opposes apartheid, a malevolent and archaic system totally alien to our ideals. The debate, which culminated in today's vote, was not whether or not to oppose apartheid but, instead, how best to oppose it and how best to bring freedom to that troubled country.

I deeply regret that Congress has seen fit to override my veto of the Comprehensive Anti-Apartheid Act of 1986. Punitive sanctions, I believe, are not the best course of action; they hurt the very people they are intended to help. My hope is that these punitive sanctions do not lead to more violence and more repression. Our administration will, nevertheless, implement the law. It must be recognized, however, that this will not solve the serious problems that plague that country. The United States must also move forward with positive measures to encourage peaceful change and advance the cause of democracy in South Africa.

Now is the time for South Africa's Government to act with courage and good sense to avert a crisis. Moderate black leaders who are committed to democracy and oppose revolutionary violence are ready to work for peaceful change. They should not be kept waiting. It would be tragic to lose this opportunity to create a truly free society which respects the rights of the majority, the minority, and the individual. There is still time for orderly change and peaceful reform. South Africans of good will, black and white, should seize the moment.

The override was seen as a major defeat for Reagan, coming at the hands of his fellow Republicans in Congress. It was subsequently revealed that there was significant debate within the White House between Reagan's political advisors advocating more compromise and those like Pat Buchanan and Donald Regan who supported Reagan's hard line against sanctions.

== Impact ==
After two years of sanctions under President Reagan, the head of South Africa's central bank argued that the nation had adjusted to financial sanctions. In 1989, the General Accounting Office said in a report that the sanctions against South Africa had been only partially enforced by the Reagan administration. In 1989, the newly elected President George Bush enacted "full enforcement" of the Anti-Apartheid Act, a departure from the Reagan administration's policy.

In 1990 and 1991, South African President F. W. de Klerk made steps towards meeting the preconditions of the Anti-Apartheid Act. In 1991, following de Klerk's repeal of Apartheid laws and the release of Nelson Mandela and other (though not all) political prisoners, President Bush issued an executive order lifting virtually all bans against doing business with South Africa. The degree to which the sanctions were responsible for ending apartheid was a matter of debate as those opposed to the sanctions argue that the South African economy was already struggling before the sanctions were enforced and that it was the political process on the ground that led to the changes. Despite the repeal of most of the sanctions imposed by this act, many companies were still restricted by laws within individual states and cities in the United States that imposed sanctions. In September 1993, Nelson Mandela called for these sanctions to be removed as well and for investment to return to a still-struggling South Africa. The last of the sanctions stemming from this act was repealed in November 1993.

== Declaration of the Act ==
The Anti-Apartheid Act of 1986 was drafted as six titles establishing United States policy towards the government of South Africa with emphasis on the economic, political, and social jurisdictions in South Africa. The Act of Congress is codified in Title 22 within Chapter 60 entitled Anti-Apartheid Program sections five thousand and one through five thousand one hundred and seventeen. The anti-apartheid legislation was repealed by the United States Congress during November 23, 1993 and October 1, 1995.

=== Title I – Policy of the United States With Respect To Ending Apartheid ===
Sec. 101. Policy toward the Government of South Africa
Sec. 102. Policy toward the African National Congress, etc.
Sec. 103. Policy toward the victims of apartheid
Sec. 104. Policy toward other countries in Southern Africa
Sec. 105. Policy toward "frontline" states
Sec. 106. Policy toward a negotiated settlement
Sec. 107. Policy toward international cooperation on measures to end apartheid
Sec. 108. Policy toward necklacing
Sec. 109. United States Ambassador to meet with Nelson Mandela
Sec. 110. Policy toward the recruitment and training of black South Africans by United States employers

=== Title II – Measures To Assist Victims Of Apartheid ===
Sec. 201. Scholarships for the victims of apartheid
Sec. 202. Human rights fund
Sec. 203. Expanding participation in the South African economy
Sec. 204. Export-Import Bank of the United States
Sec. 205. Labor practices of the United States Government in South Africa
Sec. 206. Welfare and protection of the victims of apartheid employed by the United States
Sec. 207. Employment practices of United States nationals in South Africa
Sec. 208. Code of Conduct
Sec. 209. Prohibition on assistance
Sec. 210. Use of the African Emergency Reserve
Sec. 211. Prohibition on assistance to any person or group engaging in "necklacing"
Sec. 212. Participation of South Africa in agricultural export credit and promotion programs

=== Title III – Measures by the United States To Undermine Apartheid ===
Sec. 301. Prohibition on the importation of krugerrands
Sec. 302. Prohibition on the importation of military articles
Sec. 303. Prohibition on the importation of products from parastatal organizations
Sec. 304. Prohibition on computer exports to South Africa
Sec. 305. Prohibition on loans to the Government of South Africa
Sec. 306. Prohibition on air transportation with South Africa
Sec. 307. Prohibitions on nuclear trade with South Africa
Sec. 308. Government of South Africa bank accounts
Sec. 309. Prohibition on importation of uranium and coal from South Africa
Sec. 310. Prohibition on new investment in South Africa
Sec. 311. Termination of certain provisions
Sec. 312. Policy toward violence or terrorism
Sec. 313. Termination of tax treaty and protocol
Sec. 314. Prohibition on United States Government procurement from South Africa
Sec. 315. Prohibition on the promotion of United States tourism in South Africa
Sec. 316. Prohibition on United States Government assistance to, investment in, or subsidy for trade with South Africa
Sec. 317. Prohibition on sale or export of items on Munition List
Sec. 318. Munitions list sales, notification
Sec. 319. Prohibition on importation of South African agricultural products and food
Sec. 320. Prohibition on importation of iron and steel
Sec. 321. Prohibition on exports of crude oil and petroleum products
Sec. 322. Prohibition on cooperation with the armed forces of South Africa
Sec. 323. Prohibition on sugar imports

=== Title IV – Multilateral Measures To Undermine Apartheid ===
Sec. 401. Negotiating authority
Sec. 402. Limitation on imports from other countries
Sec. 403. Private right of action

=== Title V – Future Policy Toward South Africa ===
Sec. 501. Additional measures
Sec. 502. Lifting of prohibitions
Sec. 503. Study of health conditions in the "homelands" areas of South Africa
Sec. 504. Reports on South African imports
Sec. 505. Study and report on the economy of southern Africa
Sec. 506. Report on relations between other industrialized democracies and South Africa
Sec. 507. Study and report on deposit accounts of South African nationals in United States banks
Sec. 508. Study and report on the violation of the international embargo on sale and export of military articles to South Africa
Sec. 509. Report on Communist activities in South Africa
Sec. 510. Prohibition on the importation of Soviet gold coins
Sec. 511. Economic support for disadvantaged South Africans
Sec. 512. Report on the African National Congress

=== Title VI – Enforcement and Administrative Provisions ===
Sec. 601. Regulatory authority
Sec. 602. Congressional priority procedures
Sec. 603. Enforcement and penalties
Sec. 604. Applicability to evasions of Act
Sec. 605. Construction of Act
Sec. 606. State or local anti-apartheid laws, enforce

== See also ==
- African National Congress
- Anti-Apartheid movement in the United States
- Constructive engagement
- Disinvestment from South Africa
- Free South Africa Movement
- International sanctions during apartheid
- TransAfrica
