= Randall Robinson =

American lawyer, author and activist (1941–2023)

Randall M. Robinson
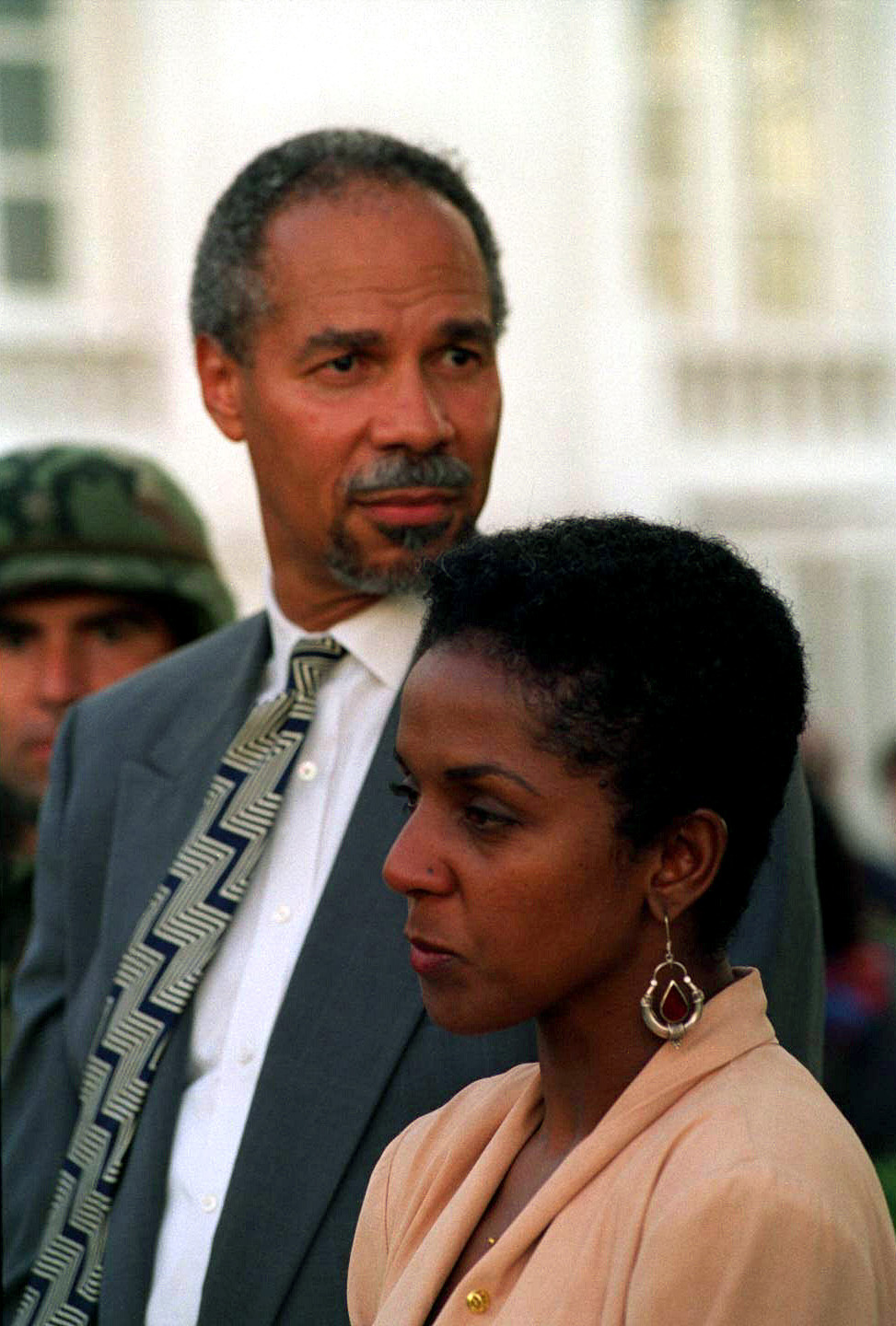
- Robinson and Hazel Ross-Robinson returning from the inauguration of Jean-Bertrand Aristide in 1994
- Born: July 6, 1941; Richmond, Virginia, U.S.
- Died: March 24, 2023 (aged 81); St. Kitts
- Education: Norfolk State College, attended; Virginia Union University, B.A., Sociology, 1967; Harvard Law School, J.D., 1970
- Occupations: Lawyer, author and activist
- Employer(s): Dickinson School of Law, Penn State University
- Known for: Anti-apartheid activism; Activism to restore democracy in Haiti
- Title: Distinguished Scholar in Residence
- Spouse: Hazel Ross-Robinson (m. 1987)
- Parents: Maxie Cleveland Robinson, Sr.; Doris Alma Jones Robinson Griffin
- Relatives: Max Robinson (brother)
- Website: randallrobinson.com law.psu.edu/faculty/robinson

Randall Robinson (July 6, 1941 – March 24, 2023) was an American lawyer, author and activist, noted as the founder of TransAfrica. He was known particularly for his impassioned opposition to apartheid, and for his advocacy on behalf of Haitian immigrants and Haitian president Jean-Bertrand Aristide. Due to his frustration with American society, Robinson emigrated to Saint Kitts in 2001.

== Early life and education ==
Robinson was born in Richmond, Virginia, on July 6, 1941, to Maxie Cleveland Robinson and Doris Robinson Griffin, both teachers. The late ABC News anchorman, Max Robinson, was his elder brother. Randall Robinson graduated from Virginia Union University, and earned a J.D. degree at Harvard Law School. He also had an older sister, actress Jewel Robinson, and a younger sister, Pastor Jean Robinson. Both sisters live and work in the Washington, D.C. area.

== Career ==
Robinson was a civil rights attorney in Boston (1971–75) before he worked for U.S. Congressman Bill Clay (1975) and as administrative assistant to Congressman Charles Diggs (1976). Robinson was a Ford fellow.

Robinson founded the TransAfrica Forum in 1977, which according to its mission statement serves as a "major research, educational and organizing institution for the African-American community, offering constructive analysis concerning U.S. policy as it affects Africa and the African Diaspora in the Caribbean and Latin America." He served in the capacity as TransAfrica's president until 2001.

During that period he gained visibility for his political activism, organizing sit-ins at the South African embassy in order to protest the Afrikaner government's racial policy of discrimination against black South Africans, beginning a personal hunger strike aimed at pressuring the United States government into restoring Jean-Bertrand Aristide to power after the short-lived coup by General Raoul Cédras, and dumping crates filled with bananas onto the steps of the United States Office of the Trade Representative in order to protest what he viewed as discriminatory trade policies aimed at Caribbean nations, such as protective tariffs and import quotas.

In 2001, he authored the book The Debt: What America Owes To Blacks, which presented an in-depth outline regarding his belief that wide-scale reparations should be offered to African Americans as a means to redress centuries of de jure and de facto discrimination and oppression directed at the group. The book argues for the enactment of lineage-based reparation programs as restitution for the continued social and economic issues in the African-American community, such as a high proportion of incarcerated black citizens and the differential in cumulative wealth between white and black Americans.

In 2003, Robinson turned down an honorary degree from Georgetown University Law Center.

Robinson began teaching at the Dickinson School of Law at Penn State University in the fall of 2008.

== Emigration ==
In 2001, Robinson quit his position as head of TransAfrica and emigrated to St. Kitts, where his wife, who is a member of a prominent Kittitian family, was born. This decision was chronicled in his book Quitting America: The Departure of a Black Man from his Native Land.

Robinson's decision to emigrate was caused by what he described as his antipathy towards America's domestic policies and foreign policy, both of which he believed exploit minorities and the poor.

== Personal life and death ==
Randall Robinson and Hazel Ross-Robinson, his wife of 37 years at the time of his death, had one daughter, Khalea Ross Robinson. He had a daughter Anike Robinson, and a son, Jabari Robinson, from a previous marriage.

Robinson died on March 24, 2023, in St. Kitts, the birthplace of his wife, where the couple had lived for twenty-two years. The cause of death was aspiration pneumonia. He was 81 years old.

== Publications ==
- The Emancipation of Wakefield Clay: a novel. London: Bogle-L'Ouverture Publications. 1978. ISBN 0904521125. LCCN 81451366.
- Makeda. New York: Akashic Books/Open Lens. 2011. ISBN 978-1617750229. LCCN 2011923178.
- An Unbroken Agony: Haiti, From Revolution to the Kidnapping of a President, Perseus Books Group, 2007. ISBN 0465070507
- Quitting America: The Departure of a Black Man From His Native Land, Plume Books (Reprint), 2004. ISBN 0452286301
- The Reckoning: What Blacks Owe to Each Other, Plume (reprint), 2002. ISBN 0452283140
- The Debt: What America Owes to Blacks, Plume, 2001. ISBN 0452282101
- Defending the Spirit, Plume (1999). ISBN 0452279682
