= Canadian Institute of Chartered Accountants =

Canadian accounting association (1902–2018)

- Formerly: Dominion Association of Chartered Accountants (1902–1951)
- Founded: 15 May 1902
- Defunct: 21 March 2018
- Fate: Merged with Certified Management Accountants of Canada and Certified General Accountants Association of Canada
- Successor: CPA Canada
- Headquarters: Toronto, Ontario
- Website: www.cica.ca

The Canadian Institute of Chartered Accountants (CICA) was incorporated by an Act of the Parliament of Canada in 1902, which later became known as the Canadian Institute of Chartered Accountants Act.

The CICA developed and supported accounting, auditing and assurance standards for organizations in Canada, developed and delivered education programs, and issued the professional designation of Chartered Accountant. The CICA was a founding member of the International Federation of Accountants and the Global Accounting Alliance.

In 2014, CICA merged with Canada's two other major accounting designations to form the Chartered Professional Accountants of Canada.

== History ==
- 1902 – The Dominion Association of Chartered Accountants (DACA) is incorporated by Private Act of the Parliament of Canada. (SC 1902, c. 58)
- 1934 – The Canada Companies Act is amended to provide for the involvement of the DACA in setting standards for accounting policies.
- 1938 – All provinces agree that membership should be determined by a Uniform Evaluation.
- 1951 – DACA changes its name to the Canadian Institute of Chartered Accountants. (SC 1951, c. 89)
- 1954 – Students in all provinces in Canada are writing the same examination.
- 1968 – The CICA releases the CICA Handbook, which codifies Canadian GAAP.
- 1972 – The Canadian Securities Administrators rule that provincial securities commissions must consider the CICA Handbook as the basis for Canadian GAAP.
- 1975 – The CICA Handbook is incorporated by reference into the Canada Business Corporations Act for specifying the basis of Canadian GAAP.
- 1990 – Act of incorporation is updated to reflect the current mandate and powers. (SC 1990, c. 52)
- 2008 – The CICA announces that Canadian GAAP will converge with International Financial Reporting Standards for publicly accountable enterprises, effective with reporting periods beginning on or after 1 January 2011.
- 2004 - The CICA begins merger talks with CMA Canada, but talks do not go beyond the exploratory stage.
- 2011 - Merger talks are renewed, this time including CGA Canada, to create a new national accounting body. Over the next three years member organizations in all provinces agree to merge, forming Chartered Professional Accountants of Canada.

== Qualification as a member ==
CAs are admitted to the profession through their Provincial Institutes/Ordre. These bodies are responsible for establishing and administering the qualification process, admission criteria and performance standards within their jurisdictions.

Pre-qualification education is delivered regionally through one of four systems across Canada:

| Region | Education provider |
|---|---|
| Atlantic provinces | Atlantic School of Chartered Accountancy |
| Quebec | Professional Education Program of the Ordre des comptables agréés du Québec |
| Ontario | CPA Ontario School of Accountancy |
| British Columbia, Alberta, Saskatchewan, Manitoba and the territories | CA School of Business |

The CICA's role – in concert with all provinces, territories – is to develop and maintain consistent, uniform standards for the profession's qualification process. These standards ensure the portability of the CA designation across Canada and internationally through various mutual recognition agreements.

Admission to the CA profession requires:

- A university degree.
- Specified university courses or the equivalent.
- Completion of a professional pre-qualification program as noted above.
- Prescribed practical experience with approved training offices, which are set in place in accredited CA firms, offices of provincial or national Auditors General, and selected corporations and government organizations.
- A passing grade in the Uniform Evaluation.

== Foreign trained accountants ==
The CICA itself does not admit members and students; its membership is derived from membership in one of the 10 provincial and two territorial institutes of chartered accountants and the Institute of Chartered Accountants of Bermuda. The institutes are empowered by local laws to regulate and govern the chartered accountancy profession within their jurisdictions. Individuals holding foreign accountancy designations who want to become a Canadian Chartered Accountant must apply to the institute in the jurisdiction where they live or intend to live.

The CICA works in partnership with and on behalf of the institutes to:

- Assess the qualification processes of foreign accounting bodies to determine the extent to which they are equivalent to the Canadian process
- Negotiate Mutual Recognition Agreements with accounting bodies whose qualification processes are substantially equivalent;
- Determine the additional education, evaluation and experience requirements for members of reviewed accounting bodies not deemed substantially equivalent.

Credentials of foreign-trained accountants are assessed according to the following categories:

| Category | Description |
|---|---|
| Designated Accounting Bodies | These designated accounting bodies are considered by the Canadian CA profession to be substantially equivalent. Members of these accounting bodies generally qualify for membership in the Canadian CA profession with minimal additional requirements. |
| Accounting Bodies with Reciprocal Membership Agreements | |
| Non-Equivalent Accounting Bodies | These accounting bodies have been reviewed by IQAB and their qualification processes have been determined not to be equivalent to the Canadian qualification process. |
| Accounting Bodies Currently Under Review | |
| Members of Non-Assessed Accounting Bodies | Individuals who are members of professional accounting bodies which have not been reviewed by IQAB, or who are not members in any professional accounting body can request individual assessment by the appropriate PICA/Ordre. This review will identify any additional education, examination and/or experience requirements the individual must complete to qualify for membership in the Canadian CA profession. |

Assessments of foreign bodies, and negotiations of Mutual Recognition agreements are conducted by the profession's International Qualifications Appraisal Board (IQAB), the current status of which is as follows:

| Country | Designated accounting body | Accounting body with Reciprocal Membership Agreement | Non-equivalent accounting body | Currently under review |
|---|---|---|---|---|
| Australia | Institute of Chartered Accountants in Australia | | CPA Australia | |
| Belgium | Institut des Réviseurs d'Enterprises de Belgique | | | |
| France | Ordre des Experts Comptables | | | |
| Hong Kong | Hong Kong Institute of Certified Public Accountants | | | |
| India | | The Institute of Chartered Accountants of India | | |
| Ireland | Institute of Chartered Accountants in Ireland | | | |
| Japan | Japanese Institute of Certified Public Accountants | | | |
| Luxembourg | | | | Institut des réviseurs d’entreprises |
| Mexico | Instituto Mexicano de Contadores Publicos | | | |
| Netherlands | Nederland Instituut van Register Accountants | | | |
| New Zealand | New Zealand Institute of Chartered Accountants | | | |
| Nigeria | | | | Institute of Chartered Accountants of Nigeria |
| Pakistan | | | Institute of Chartered Accountants of Pakistan currently under review | |
| Philippines | | | Philippine Institute of Certified Public Accountants | |
| South Africa | South African Institute of Chartered Accountants | | | |
| Sri Lanka | | | Institute of Chartered Accountants of Sri Lanka | |
| Switzerland | | | | Swiss Institute of Certified Accountants and Tax Consultants |
| United Kingdom | Institute of Chartered Accountants in England and Wales, Institute of Chartered Accountants of Scotland | | Association of Chartered Certified Accountants | |
| United States | American Institute of Certified Public Accountants, National Association of State Boards of Accountancy | | | |
| Zimbabwe | Institute of Chartered Accountants of Zimbabwe | | | |

== Arms ==
Coat of arms of Canadian Institute of Chartered Accountants
| Notes Recorded at the College of Arms 20 November 1961; registered with the Canadian Heraldic Authority 15 June 2022. Crest Two maple leaves Or in front of a balance Sable. Escutcheon Azure two quills in saltire Or, a bordure Argent set with ten maple leaves Proper. Motto Probus et utilis ("Honest and useful") |

== See also ==
- Chartered Professional Accountant
- Accounting Standards Board (Canada)
- International Qualification Examination
- Uniform Evaluation

== Member institutes ==
| Province | Institute/Ordre |
|---|---|
| British Columbia | The Institute of Chartered Accountants of British Columbia |
| Alberta | The Institute of Chartered Accountants of Alberta |
| Saskatchewan | The Institute of Chartered Accountants of Saskatchewan |
| Manitoba | Institute of Chartered Accountants of Manitoba |
| Ontario | Chartered Professional Accountants Ontario |
| Quebec | Ordre des comptables professionnels agréés du Québec |
| New Brunswick | The New Brunswick Institute of Chartered Accountants |
| Nova Scotia | The Institute of Chartered Accountants of Nova Scotia |
| Prince Edward Island | Institute of Chartered Accountants of Prince Edward Island |
| Newfoundland and Labrador | The Institute of Chartered Accountants of Newfoundland and Labrador |
| Yukon | Institute of Chartered Accountants of the Yukon Territory |
| Northwest Territories and Nunavut | Institute of Chartered Accountants of the Northwest Territories and Nunavut |
| Bermuda | Institute of Chartered Accountants of Bermuda |
