= Certified General Accountants of Ontario =

Certified General Accountants of Ontario (CGA Ontario)
- Industry: Accountancy and Finance
- Founded: Canada (1957)
- Headquarters: Toronto, Ontario, Canada
- Website: www.cga-ontario.org

Certified General Accountants of Ontario (CGA Ontario) is the professional association of certified general accountants in the province of Ontario, Canada. It is the largest affiliate organization of CGAs in the world, responsible for the accreditation, regulation and professional development of more than 20,000 CGAs in fields such as business and industry, government, the public sector, and professional practice. CGA Ontario also administers and delivers the CGA program of professional studies to more than 8,000 students, granting exclusive rights to the CGA designation in Ontario.

== About CGA Ontario ==
CGA Ontario is headquartered in Toronto, Ontario. It is an affiliate of the Certified General Accountants Association of Canada (CGA Canada), the national accountancy body of CGAs in Canada, which comprises more than 10 provincial, territorial and international organizations. These organizations work collaboratively with CGA Canada as a federation.

CGA Ontario is one of the three authorized designated bodies (CA, CMA, and CGA Ontario) in the province of Ontario that may grant public accounting licences to its members. The association was authorized by the Public Accountants Council for the Province of Ontario in June 2010.

== CGA Program Of Professional Studies ==
The CGA program of professional studies is a multi-year process of accreditation through which individuals are granted the certified general accountant (CGA) designation.

=== Competency-based learning ===
The CGA program is a competency-based curriculum that requires candidates to perform tasks and roles to standards expected in the work environment. The knowledge, skills and professional values required of a CGA are based on the CGA Competency Framework, a list of 130 competencies required of a newly certified CGA, under three general areas: professionalism, leadership and professional knowledge.

The complete academic program consists of 19 courses, two business cases, and professional qualification exams: Foundation Studies, Advanced Studies, and PACE qualification.

=== Online delivery ===
CGA Ontario administers the online learning environment on behalf of several CGA affiliate organizations program in addition to administering the program to students enrolled in the province of Ontario.

== Governance ==
CGA Ontario is a self-governing body, governed by the provisions of the Certified General Accountants of Ontario Act, 2010, the CGA Ontario By-Law, and the CGA Ontario Code of Ethical Principles and Rules of Conduct. Elections to CGA Ontario's board of directors are held on an annual basis via an online voting system during the month of May. Terms are staggered and newly elected directors assume office in June. Administration of the association is conducted from the office of the chief executive officer. The association's 18 chapters are administered by an elected board of directors and chapter chair.

== History ==
CGA Ontario traces its history to 1916, when CGAs living in Ontario approached CGA Canada (formed in 1913) with the proposal to form a branch in Toronto. By virtue of its size and rising industrial and commercial importance, Toronto had the greatest number of CGA aspirants outside Montreal, where CGA Canada was based at the time (its head office is now located in Vancouver).

The Toronto Branch of CGA Canada was formed in 1921 and comprised 35 members. Its head office was located in the Traders Bank of Canada Building, at 67 Yonge Street in Toronto. In 1932, Ivy Thomas, a member of CGA Ontario, became the first female CGA and one of the first female professional accountants in the history of Canada.

In 1952, CGA Canada amended its national bylaws to refer to provincial "associations" rather than branches, and Toronto Branch was officially renamed CGA Ontario. In 1957, CGA Ontario was incorporated by a provincial charter, and a number of provincial branches became "chapters" of CGA Ontario. In 1973, CGA Ontario became the first association of accountants in Canada to implement a mandatory program of continuing professional development.

In June 2010, CGA Ontario was granted authorized designated body status by the Public Accountants Council for the Province of Ontario, enabling it to license CGAs in the province of Ontario to practise public accounting.

CGA Ontario is active in academic research and public policy. In 2010 it created the CGA Ontario Professorship in Accounting at the University of Toronto's Rotman School of Management. In 2012 it created the CGA Ontario Chair in International Entrepreneurship at York University's Schulich School of Business.

In 2014, CGA Ontario joined the Canadian Institute of Chartered Accountants and Certified Management Accountants of Canada to become the Chartered Professional Accountants. This brought an end to CGA Ontario.

== Advertising ==
We see more than numbers is the first national advertising campaign in the history of the CGA designation. It was conceived by Grip Limited, a communications agency based in Toronto, whose clients have included Honda, Cadbury Adams, Glaxo Smith Kline, and lululemon athletica.

The campaign features semi-transparent numbers overlaying images of today's business environment, and the tagline, We see more than numbers, emphasizes the credibility and vision that CGAs bring to organizations and clientele."

== Prominent Ontario CGAs ==
=== Business and finance ===
- Ann Godbehere – Member, Board of Directors, UBS
- Stephen Letwin - President and chief executive officer, Iamgold
- Sergio Marchionne – chief executive officer, Fiat S.p.A. and Fiat Group Automobiles
- Ray Patrick - President, Mary Kay Canada
- K. Rai Sahi – President and CEO, ClubLink Corporation

=== Law ===
- Vern Krishna – Professor of Tax Law, University of Ottawa

=== Politics ===
- Bryan Hayes – Member of Parliament, Sault Ste. Marie
- Yasmin Ratansi – Former Member of Parliament, Don Valley East
- Carl Zehr – Mayor of Kitchener, Ontario

=== Public sector ===
- Deepak Chopra – President and chief executive officer, Canada Post
- Joseph Pennachetti – City Manager, City of Toronto

=== Sports and recreation ===
- Darus Suharto – Poker Player
