= Certified Accountant =

Certified Accountant may refer to:

- Certified Public Accountant, a statutory title of qualified accountants in several countries
- Chartered Accountant, an Indian certified professional position created through the 1949 Chartered Accountants Act and overseen by the Institute of Chartered Accountants of India
- Certified General Accountant, a Canadian qualified accountant designation
- Certified Management Accountant, a qualified accountant designation in U.S. and Canada
- Certified National Accountant, a Nigerian qualified accountant designation
- Certified Practising Accountant, a title used by members of CPA Australia
- Chartered Certified Accountant or Certified Accountant, a British designation

== See also ==
- Chartered accountant
- Chartered Professional Accountant
