= University of Waterloo School of Accounting and Finance =

Canadian business school

School of Accounting and Finance
- Former name: School of Accountancy
- Type: School
- Established: 1980
- Parent institution: Faculty of Arts
- Affiliations: University of Waterloo
- Director: Blake Phillips
- Academic staff: 67
- Undergraduates: 1,734 (Undergrad, Fall 2025)
- Postgraduates: 286 (Masters & Doctoral, Winter 2026)
- Location: Waterloo, Ontario, Canada; 43°28′6.276″N 80°32′29.328″W
- Website: uwaterloo.ca/school-of-accounting-and-finance/

The School of Accounting and Finance (SAF) at University of Waterloo is a professional school within the Faculty of Arts. The school was established in 1980 under the name 'School of Accountancy'. Its name was changed in 2008 to better reflect its program offering. Today, more than 1,700 students are enrolled in the school's programs. In September 2009, a new 52,000 square feet (5,000 m^{2}) building was officially opened to house the school.

The School of Accounting and Finance offers the largest accounting and finance undergraduate cooperative education (co-op) program in Canada.

The school's Master of Accounting (MAcc) Program allows students to complete all required Chartered Professional Accountant (CPA) modules within eight months, and is only open to students who complete the school's undergrad programs. MAcc graduates only need to challenge (and pass) the Common Final Examination and accumulate the required professional experiences in order to become a CPA. MAcc and industry experiences gained from co-op are well known among Canadian accounting and finance industries.

In June 2021, it was announced that the school and the Faculty of Environment will begin offering a new undergrad program, "Sustainability and Financial Management", and accept its first cohort of students starting Fall 2022. The program was created to prepare a new generation of accounting and finance professionals to lead businesses through an era of environmental sustainability, and to respond to the increasing importance of environmental finance and ESG factors.

== Programs of study ==
The School of Accounting and Finance offers four undergraduate programs, two graduate programs and one doctoral program. Additionally, the school jointly administers one undergraduate program and one graduate program with the Faculty of Mathematics and one undergraduate program with the Faculty of Science.

The Bachelor of Accounting and Financial Management (BAFM) and Bachelor of Computing and Financial Management (BCFM) degrees are both CFA Institute's University Affiliated Programs, which recognize academic institutions that embed a significant portion of the CFA Program Candidate Body of Knowledge (CBOK) into their curriculum.

== Undergraduate education ==
Bachelor of Accounting and Financial Management Co-op (BAFM):

- Graduates of the BAFM program typically aspire to a host of professional accounting and/or finance credentials such as the Chartered Professional Accountant (CPA), Chartered Financial Analyst (CFA) and Chartered Business Valuator (CBV) designations. All BAFM graduates are eligible to apply to the school's Master of Accounting (MAcc) program. Students in BAFM must complete four co-op work terms, in total of 16 months of experiences, which could be eligible for CPA accreditation purposes (30 months required).

AFM Specializations: The Accounting and Financial Management (AFM) program offers 6 specializations in areas such as public accounting, finance, entrepreneurship, sustainability, Business analytics, and corporate governance. The first two years at AFM is focused on laying the foundations in accounting and finance, with a focus in people skills, learning, and academic success. The initiative includes experiential learning opportunities such as events, workshops, interactive webcasts, and team-based problem-solving situations connected to courses and extra-curricular situations. Students must then select a specialization from the list below in their 3rd and 4th year:

1. Professional Accountant Career Specialization
2. Entrepreneurial Mindset Career Specialization
3. Financial Leadership Career Specialization
4. Financial Markets Career Specialization
5. Business Analytics Career Specialization
6. Sustainability Career Specialization

Students may choose two specializations at most.

Bachelor of Sustainability and Financial Management Co-op (BSFM):

- SFM students are able to become finance or accounting experts with purpose by learning to integrate people, profits, and the planet into the bottom line. Graduates of the program typically aspire to get one or more of the following professional designations, Chartered Professional Accountant (CPA), Chartered Financial Analyst (CFA) or Chartered Business Valuator (CBV). All BSFM graduates are eligible to apply to the school's Master of Accounting (MAcc) program. All BSFM students must complete four co-op work terms, for a total of 16 months of experience, which could be eligible for CPA accreditation purposes (30 months required).

SFM Specializations: The Sustainability and Financial Management (SFM) program offers 3 specializations: corporate sustainability, financial markets, and entrepreneurship. The first two years of the SFM program is focused on giving students a foundational understanding of accounting, finance, and sustainability. This includes experiential learning opportunities such as events, workshops, competitions, and team-based problem-solving situations connected to courses and extra-curriculars. Students must then select a specialization from the list below in their 3rd and 4th year:

1. Corporate Sustainability (CPA pathway)
2. Government Policy and Financial Markets (CFA pathway)
3. Indigenous Entrepreneurship

Mathematics/Chartered Professional Accountancy Co-op (Math/CPA):

- Math/CPA students have less flexibility in their degree as students take math courses along with the accounting and finance courses BAFM students take, leaving very few elective spaces. The work-term sequence is structured similar to the BAFM schedule, with 4 co-op terms. The Math/CA program was renamed to Math/CPA in 2013.

Biotechnology/Chartered Professional Accountancy Co-op (Biotech/CPA):

- This program is offered jointly with the Faculty of Science. Students in the Biotech/CPA program take science courses along with the accounting and finance courses. Biotech/CPA students have little flexibility in their degree, and in some terms, are required to take extra courses. Biotech/CPA students composed of the smallest population in the school, with only around 10-15 students admitted per academic year. Students in the program may obtain co-op employment deemed by professional bodies to be qualifying practical experience for accreditation purposes, similar to BAFM and Math/CPA, with 4 required co-op terms. Biotech/CPA students are eligible to apply to the school's MAcc program. The Biotech/CA program was renamed to Biotech/CPA in 2013.

Bachelor of Computing and Financial Management (BCFM):

- This program is offered jointly with the David R. Cheriton School of Computer Science in the Faculty of Mathematics. Students take computer science courses along with accounting and finance courses. Stronger emphasis is placed upon computer science and finance, less on accounting. The students receive a unique degree in Canada, "Bachelor of Computing and Financial Management" after graduation. Students in this program typically complete six co-op work terms, with the first commencing between semester two and three. CFM students/graduates are not eligible to apply to the school's MAcc program and are unable to take advantage of the CPA accreditation.

== Postgraduate education ==
Master of Accounting (MAcc):

- This 8-month program is accredited by CPA Canada, so students who successfully complete the program, including all CPA requirements, are exempt from all 6 modules of the CPA Professional Education Program and may proceed directly to the Common Final Examination (CFE). Aside from gaining depth in the CPA elective subjects including Taxation, Assurance, Performance Management and Finance, MAcc students can explore other career options such as business valuations, forensic accounting, data analytics, internal audit and international tax. Approximately 65% of undergrads pursue the MAcc degree in 2016.
- Furthermore, students who have taken and passed ACC606 Business Valuations receive advanced standings in the CBV Institute Programme of Studies. Students will receive exemptions for Level I – Introductory Business Valuation and Level II – Intermediate Business Valuation.

Master of Taxation (MTax):

- The Master of Taxation program is open to all students from different backgrounds to apply. MTax is offered under a full-time basis (1 year + 1 co-op term) or a part-time basis (2 years). Graduates attain broad-based competencies in tax subject areas that include policy, research, statutory interpretation, estate planning, business structuring, and risk management, with all the classes held in downtown Toronto's Eaton Centre.

Master of Quantitative Finance (MQF):

- Focuses on the fundamental disciplines of mathematics, statistics, econometrics, computer science and finance. This program is offered jointly with Faculty of Mathematics.

PhD in Accounting:

- The University of Waterloo's School of Accounting and Finance can provide doctoral training in research that is based on economic theory, empirical economics, behavioural science, and other methodologies.

== School reputation and achievement ==
According to QS World University Rankings, School of Accounting and Finance ranks 101-150 globally in 2022 for the subject category of Accounting & Finance. SAF also ranks high in the 2020 Global Accounting Research Survey conducted by Brigham Young University:

- An overall ranking of 2nd in Canada and 10th globally for accounting research
- 1st in Canada for accounting information systems research
- 1st in Canada for managerial accounting research
- 1st in Canada for tax research
- 2nd in Canada for financial accounting research
- 2nd in Canada in Accounting PhD programs
- 3rd in Canada in audit research

=== Co-op success ===
With co-operative education, over 95% of students secure full-time employment before graduation. The co-op employment rate has been consistently between 95% and 100% with the students working mainly in global, regional, and local accounting firms, chartered banks, asset managers and other financial services firms/intermeriaties, government, and non-financial corporations in accounting/finance related roles.

=== UFE/CFE honour roll and gold medalists ===
The School of Accounting & Finance has had success in its students and faculty research. Notably, many students who have challenged the Common Final Examination achieve honour roll as well as gold medal (Ontario and National).

The National Honour Roll of the Common Final Exam recognizes candidates whose performance in the exam demonstrated academic excellence and exceptional abilities. The candidates listed on the Honour Roll are determined as the top 1% of the first-time writers who wrote all three days. In 2018 and 2019, SAF captured the National Gold Medal (highest CFE score in Canada) consecutively. SAF has obtained 6 national gold medals (best performance in Canada) from the period between 2010 and 2020. The CFE honour roll and successful CFE writers are mostly the Master of Accounting students. From 2018 to 2020, SAF students accounted for 23.5%, 18.5% and 18.9% of the Honour Roll recipients respectively - the best performance in Canada.

Year of CFE/UFE	Honour Roll^{1}	Ontario Gold Medal^{2}	National Gold Medal	CFE Total Honour Roll Recipients	Total % of UW SAF Students on Honour Roll						
Year of CFE/UFE	Honour Roll^{1}	Ontario Gold Medal^{2}	National Gold Medal	CFE Total Honour Roll Recipients	Total % of UW SAF Students on Honour Roll	September 2025	7	0	0	56	12.5%
September 2024	7	1	0	49	14.3%						
September 2023	12	1	0	57	21.1%						
September 2022	11	0	0	59	18.6%						
September 2021	8	0	0	68	11.8%						
2020	15	0	0	74	20.3%						
2019	15	1	1	81	18.5%						
2018	16	1	1	68	23.5%						
2017	13	0	0	68	19.1%						
Sept 2016	6	1	0	53	11.3%						
May 2016	1	1	0	20	5.0%						
2015	11	0	0	52	21.2%						
Common Final Examination (CFE) replaced the Uniform Evaluation (UFE) starting 2015.
1982-2014	129	10	6	N/A	N/A						
Total	251	16	8	N/A	N/A						
Total MAcc Students on Honour Roll					188						

^{1} Honour roll count includes the gold medalists (3 regional + 1 national gold medalist).
^{2} If winner of the Ontario Gold Medal also wins National Gold Medal, such count is tallied separately.
^{3} The May 2021 CFE was only offered in the West and Atlantic Canada regions. The exam was not held in Ontario due to COVID-19 pandemic.

=== CFA Institute Research Challenge ===
In 2016, School of Accounting & Finance students became the first Canadian team to win the global annual CFA Institute Research Challenge. The CFA Institute Research Challenge comprises over 140 CFA member societies, 3,500 member volunteers, and more than 5,000 students from over 1,000 universities. The CFA Institute Research Challenge requires student teams (1 team per university) to research and analyze a publicly traded company and then write a research report on their assigned company with a buy, sell, or hold recommendation.

In 2021, School of Accounting & Finance was once again awarded the Americas Regional Champion at the 2021 CFA Institute Research Challenge, where 5,000 students across 950 universities and 82 countries participated virtually.

In 2024, the School captured its second global champion title after eight years. The team competed against 1,100 schools and 6,700 students in six rounds of competition. The school remained the only Canadian school to ever capture the global champion title.

In 2026, the School won its third global champion title against more than 8,000 students from 1,200 schools worldwide.

== Student life ==
Aside from the clubs/societies available within the University of Waterloo, there are various extra-curricular activities available to SAF students only. The Accounting and Finance Student Association (AFSA) is the government body for the SAF undergrad students, divided into many sub-committees. AFSA is run and governed by a fully elected executive team and a partially elected board of directors. SAF also holds a student-run orientation week for first year undergrad students after the regular Waterloo orientation week, Accounting and Finance Orientation Week (AFOW).

Furthermore, ACE Consulting Group is also a SAF student-run consulting organization that provides Kitchener-Waterloo entrepreneurs and small business clients with professional consulting services.

The School of Accounting and Finance Outreach & Ambassador Program (SOAP) is a yearlong program for current SAF students to represent the school in recruiting, marketing, and connecting with future prospective students.

Other initiatives in relation to SAF academic learning include:

- Student Investment Fund
- Student Venture Fund
- Non-Profit Organization Consulting (NPOC)
- Young Tax Professionals
- David T. Carter Financial Review Team

School of Accounting and Finance organizes two national student-run conferences annually:

- University of Waterloo Accounting Conference (UWAC)
- hEDGE Financial Services Conference

== Notable alumni and faculty ==
Today, there are 9,000+ alumni working in 38 countries, of which at least 4,300 grads have attained their CPA designation.

- Kevin Strain: President & CEO of Sun Life Financial. (MAcc '90)
- Grace Lee Reynolds: CEO of MaRS Discovery District. (MAcc '94)
- Benjie M. Thomas: CEO of KPMG Canada. (PDAcc '98)
- Tim Jackson: President & CEO of SHAD Canada. (BA '92)
- Pamela Steer: CEO of CPA Canada.
- Keith Farlinger: Former CEO of BDO Global. (BMath '77)
- David Cates: President & CEO of Denison Mines. (MAcc '05)
- Anilisa Sainani: CFO of EQB Inc. (Equitable Bank). (MAcc '06)
- Betty Ann Jarrett: Global Human Capital Leader of PricewaterhouseCoopers. (MAcc '86)
- Cindy Ditner: Global head of assurance of BDO Global. (MAcc '86)
- Anish Chopra: Former board chair of CBV Institute. (MAcc '94)
- Paul Langill: CFO of Alberta Investment Management Corporation. (MAcc '91)
- Sahezad Pardhan: CFO of Cadillac Fairview. (MAcc '04)
- Christine D’Sylva: CFO of Pizza Pizza. (MAcc '03)
- Paul Dobson: CFO of Ballard Power Systems. (BA '90)
- Jeff Bell: CFO of SNC-Lavalin. (BA '90)
- Troy Maxwell: COO of RBC Capital Markets. (MAcc '89)
- Allan Brett: CFO of Descartes Systems Group. (BA '91)
- Michelle Lam: Founder and former CEO of True & Co., a direct-to-consumer digital intimate apparel brand, headquartered in San Francisco, California. (MAcc '01)

== See also ==
- Chartered Financial Analyst
- CBV Institute
- CFA Institute
- CFA Institute Research Challenge
- CPA Canada
- Common Final Examination
- University of Waterloo
