= International Qualification Examination =

The International Qualification Examination (IQEX) is an examination sat by certain non-U.S. qualified accountants seeking the Certified Public Accountant designation in the United States.

The examination is set by the American Institute of Certified Public Accountants (AICPA) and administered by the National Association of State Boards of Accountancy (NASBA).

== Eligibility ==
In principle the following members of the following overseas bodies are eligible via Mutual Recognition Agreements (MRAs) :

- CPA Australia
- Chartered Accountants Australia and New Zealand (CAANZ)
- CPA Canada (CPAC)
- Hong Kong Institute of Certified Public Accountants (HKICPA)
- Chartered Accountants Ireland (CAI)
- Instituto Mexicano de Contadores Publicos (IMCP)
- Institute of Chartered Accountants of Scotland (ICAS)
- South African Institute of Chartered Accountants

Those who have acquired their overseas membership through mutual recognition or reciprocity are not eligible. For example, an Australian or Irish Chartered Accountant who originally qualified as a member of the Institute of Chartered Accountants in England and Wales would not be eligible.

Those from recognized overseas bodies who are not eligible to sit for IQEX may apply to a U.S. State Board of Accountancy to sit for the Uniform CPA Exam under normal rules. The Colorado State Board of Accountancy, Delaware State Board of Accountancy and Illinois State Board of Accountancy are popular choices for overseas qualified accountants.

Details on IQEX eligibility, IQEX training programs and CPA licensure are available at

== Administration ==
The administration of the IQEX exam is similar to that for the Uniform CPA Exam, with a few key differences:

- Application is made directly to NASBA, not to a state board of accountancy
- The exam can be sat at Prometric test centers outside the United States (although Canada is the only other country in which the exam is normally offered)
- Instead of being available all year round, IQEX is only offered for three weeks in October or November each year.
- Results are sent directly to the candidate by NASBA (normally in February, following the exam in November)

The fee to sit IQEX is US$845 as a first time candidate, and US$795 as a re-examination candidate. Australian CPAs required to sit the AUD section of the Uniform CPA Exam must pay US$1,030 as a first time candidate, and US$795 for re-examination. Should AUD be applied for on its own the fee is US$185.

== Licensure or certification as a CPA ==
After successfully passing IQEX, candidates must still meet the requirements of one of the 55 State Boards of Accountancy in order to be licensed or certified as a CPA.

Although state boards are not involved in the IQEX examination itself, they still reserve the right to decide on CPA licensure and certification.

- Most successful IQEX candidates (who do not need a license from a particular state) apply for a CPA certificate from the Illinois State Board of Accountancy. This is the most straightforward option, as Illinois does not require any further educational, ethics or work experience requirements for certification.
- Some state boards do not accept IQEX, or only accept it under certain conditions. Some may not accept Australian Chartered Accountants, for example, or may only accept Canadian Chartered Accountants from certain Canadian provinces.
- American Institute of Certified Public Accountants
- National Association of State Boards of Accountancy
- Uniform Certified Public Accountant Examination
