= Master of Accountancy =

Graduate professional degree

The Master of Accountancy (MAcc, MAcy, or MAccy), alternatively Master of Science in Accounting (MSA or MSAcy) or Master of Professional Accountancy (MPAcy, MPAcc, MPA or MPAc), is a graduate professional degree designed to prepare students for public accounting; academic-focused variants are also offered.

In the United States, the program provides students with the 150 credit hours of classroom, but mostly clinical hours, required by most states before taking the Uniform Certified Public Accountant Examination. This specialty program usually runs one to two years in length and contains from ten to twelve three semester credit courses (30 to 36 semester hours total). The program may consist of all graduate accounting courses or a combination of graduate accounting courses, graduate management, tax, leadership and other graduate business electives. The program is designed to not only prepare students for the CPA examination but also to provide a strong knowledge of accounting principles and business applications.

Similar graduate programs exist in Canada, where certain universities offer master's programs and waive all education requirements up until the Common Final Examination (CFE) in order to become a Canadian CPA. These schools include Brock University's Goodman School of Business, Carleton University's Sprott School of Business, University of Saskatchewan's Edwards School of Business, and University of Waterloo's School of Accounting and Finance.

A Master of Professional Accounting can also be obtained from Australian universities to qualify for the Australian CPA, IPA or CA. Entrants with insufficient undergraduate accounting credits will complete a preliminary (additional) year of the Master's or a Graduate Certificate in Accountancy, both offered by the university.

As above, in other countries the degree's purpose may differ. Where the Bachelor of Accountancy is the prerequisite for professional practice - for example in South Africa - the Master of Accountancy then comprises specialized coursework in a specific area of accountancy (computer auditing, taxation...), as opposed to CPA preparation as above. It may also be offered as a thesis-based program, granting access to doctoral programs.

Graduates entering corporate accounting or consulting often additionally (alternatively) pursue the Certified Management Accountant (CMA), Certified Internal Auditor (CIA) or other such certifications.

== See also ==
- Accounting scholarship
- Accounting § Education, training and qualifications
- Bachelor of Accountancy
- Certified Public Accountant
- Chartered Professional Accountant
- Enrolled Agent
- List of master's degrees
- Master of Laws
- Master of Taxation
