= Hong Kong Financial Reporting Standards =

Financial reporting standards of Hong Kong

The Hong Kong Financial Reporting Standards (HKFRS) is a set of financial reporting standards issued by the Hong Kong Institute of Certified Public Accountants in Hong Kong.

It comprises a collection of standards, these include:

- Hong Kong Financial Reporting Standard (HKFRS)
- HKFRS Interpretation (HKFRS-Int)
- Hong Kong Accounting Standards (HKAS)
- HKAS Interpretation (HKAS-Int)
