= Carl Zehr =

33rd Mayor of Kitchener (born 1945)

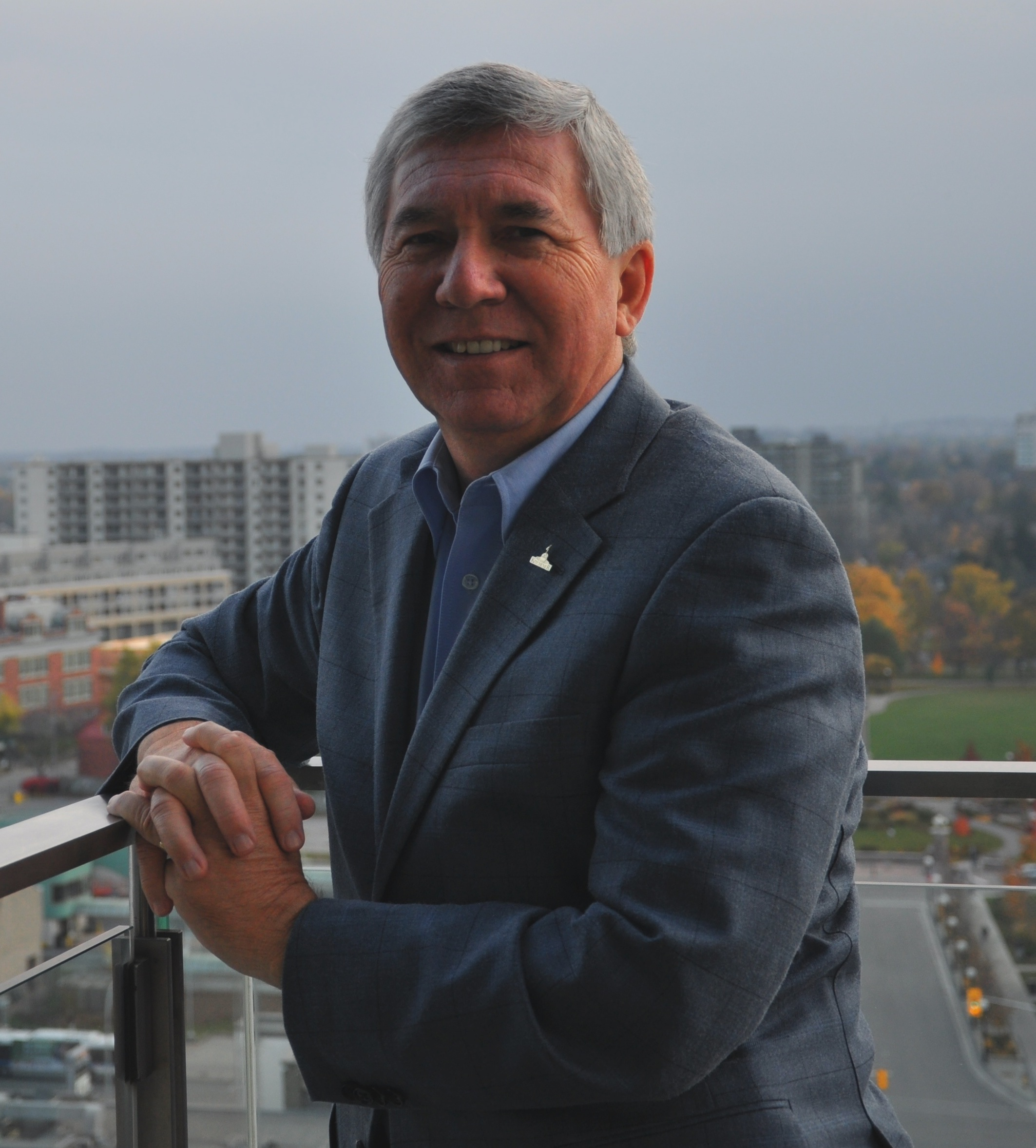
- Zehr at Kitchener City Hall, 2010

Mayor of Kitchener
- In office 1997–2014
- Preceded by: Richard Christy
- Succeeded by: Berry Vrbanovic

Personal details
- Born: 1945 (age 80–81) Baden, Ontario, Canada
- Party: Independent (1985–1994, 1997–2014)
- Other political affiliations: Ontario Liberal (1990–1990)
- Occupation: Politician; accountant

Carl Zehr (born c. 1945) is a retired Canadian politician. He served as the mayor of Kitchener from 1997 to 2014. Prior to that he was a city councillor from 1985 to 1994. As of 2025, he was the longest-serving mayor in Kitchener. He was a member of the Large Urban Mayors' Caucus of Ontario and served as its chair in 1999. He was also a member of the Big City Mayors Caucus (Canada) from 1997 to 2014.

== Background ==
Zehr was born in Baden, Ontario, and is a graduate of Rockway Mennonite Collegiate in Kitchener. His first job was in the accounting office of the Kitchener-Waterloo Hospital. He has served as a member of the board of numerous Kitchener area organizations: the Kitchener-Wilmot Hydro Board, the University of Waterloo, Centre in the Square, and Kitchener Housing Inc.

Zehr is a Certified General Accountant, a member and past chair of the Certified General Accountants of Ontario, and a fellow (FCGA) of the Certified General Accountants Association of Canada. In 1991 he received the Ivy Thomas Award, which is bestowed upon an Ontario CGA who has achieved provincial recognition for outstanding public service or charitable involvement, including humanitarian acts. Zehr is also the 2006 recipient of the Ontario Pharmacist Association Visionary Award, and a Paul P. Harris Fellow of the Rotary Club of Kitchener, in recognition of service to the community and club. Zehr appeared in a cameo role episode 2, season 1 of CTV's Dan for Mayor.

== Political career ==
Zehr was the Ontario Liberal Party candidate in Kitchener—Wilmot in the 1990 provincial election, but came in second to New Democrat Mike Cooper.

Zehr was elected as mayor in 1997. He previously served as a city councillor from 1985 to 1994.

On February 4, 2014, Zehr confirmed he would not be seeking re-election in the 2014 municipal elections.

He is the namesake of Carl Zehr Square, a public square at Kitchener City Hall.
