= Benny K B Kwok =

Benny K B Kwok is a forensic accountant and an expert witness.

He is the author of a series of published titles in print worldwide - Forensic Accountancy 1st & 2nd Editions Financial Analysis in Hong Kong 1st & 2nd Editions, "Business Terms & Phrases for Surveyors, Engineers & Facilities Managers in Hong Kong" (Knowledge Conservation 2016) ISBN 9789887735106 and Accounting Irregularities in Financial Statements. He co-authored a paper titled "Emergence of Fintech and cybersecurity in a global financial centre: Strategic approach by a regulator" published in Journal of Financial Regulation and Compliance in 2017

Kwok worked in the United Kingdom during the 1980s and 1990s, and is based in Hong Kong as an independent forensic expert or forensic accountant in litigation support, dispute analysis and fraud investigation.

Kwok is an adjunct professor in forensic accounting at HKU Business School, The University of Hong Kong.

Kwok is a regular speaker at university conferences, media interviews and professional seminars, including those held by The University of Hong Kong, Hong Kong Polytechnic University, Metro Broadcast Corporation, Law Society of Hong Kong, Hong Kong Institute of Surveyors and Hong Kong Institute of Certified Public Accountants.

Kwok's contributions in this field last year (2014) include articles published by: The Institute of Chartered Accountants in England and Wales; Forensic accountancy in Hong Kong: Trends in a Decade at: ; The Actuarial Society of Hong Kong; Quantum Assessment of Losses of Inventories by Forensic Accountants at: ; and The Hong Kong Institute of Certified Public Accountants: Quantum Assessment of Losses of Inventories by Forensic CPAs (Certified Public Accountants) at: .
