= Sergio Marchionne =

Italian-Canadian businessman (1952–2018)

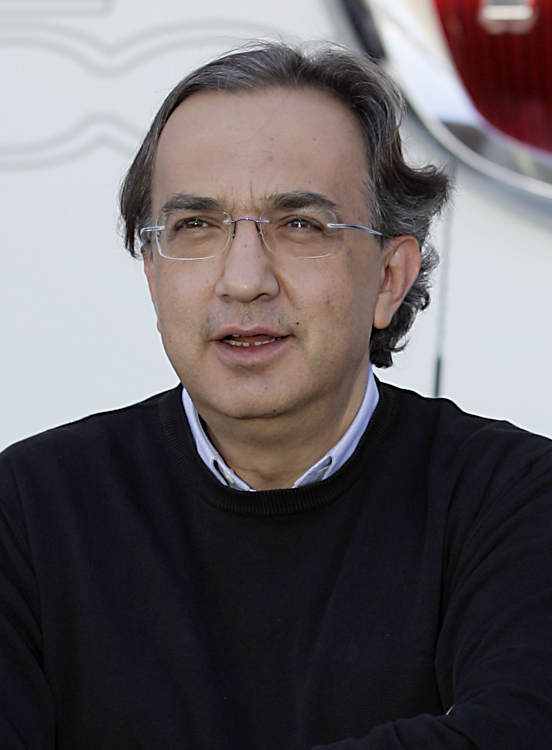
- Marchionne in 2007
- Born: 17 June 1952; Chieti, Italy
- Died: 25 July 2018 (aged 66); Zürich, Switzerland
- Education: University of Toronto; University of Windsor; Osgoode Hall Law School
- Occupations: Former Chairman of CNH Industrial; Former CEO of Ferrari; Former CEO of Fiat Chrysler Automobiles; Former Chairman of Maserati; Former CEO of FCA Italy; Former CEO of FCA US; Former Chairman of SGS
- Spouse: Orlandina (div.)
- Partner: Manuela Battezzato
- Children: 2 sons

Sergio Marchionne (Italian: [ˈsɛrdʒo marˈkjɔnne]; 17 June 1952 – 25 July 2018) was an Italian-Canadian businessman, widely known for his turnarounds of the automakers Fiat and Chrysler, his business acumen and his outspoken and often frank approach, especially when dealing with unpalatable issues related to his companies and the automotive industry.

Marchionne was the chairman of CNH Industrial, the chief executive officer (CEO) of Fiat Chrysler Automobiles (FCA), the chairman and CEO of FCA US LLC, the chairman and CEO of Ferrari, and the chairman of Maserati. He was the chairman of Swiss-based SGS and vice chairman of UBS from 2008 to 2010, as well as the chairman of the European Automobile Manufacturers Association for 2012 (first elected in January 2006). He was a member of the Peterson Institute for International Economics, and the chairman of the Italian branch of the Council for the United States and Italy.

Noted for his keen observations of the automotive industry, Marchionne offered insights ranging from frank criticism of his company's own products to a highly regarded 2015 presentation titled Confessions of a Capital Junkie, which extolled the benefits of industry consolidation.

Marchionne was widely recognized for turning around Fiat Group to become one of the fastest-growing companies in the auto industry, in less than two years. In 2009, he was instrumental in Fiat Group forming a strategic alliance with the ailing US automaker Chrysler, with the support of the U.S. and Canadian governments and trade unions. Less than two years later, following its emergence from Chapter 11, Chrysler returned to profitability, repaying some of its government loans. In 2014, Fiat and Chrysler merged into a new holding company, Fiat Chrysler Automobiles, then the seventh-largest automobile manufacturer in the world.

Following complications from surgery, Marchionne resigned from all of his positions in July 2018, and he died a few days later. The American business channel CNBC described Marchionne as a "legend" of the automotive industry, while the British newspaper Financial Times considered him as having been "one of the boldest business leaders of his generation".

== Early life ==
Marchionne was born in Chieti, Abruzzo, Italy, the son of Concezio Marchionne, from Cugnoli (Abruzzo), and Maria Zuccon from Carnizza (today Krnica, Croatia) near Pula in Istria. His father served as a Carabiniere in Istria, where he met his future wife. Marchionne's grandfather, Giacomo Zuccon, was killed in September 1943 by Yugoslav Partisans near Barban in Istria, while his uncle Giuseppe Zuccon was killed by German troops the same year. In 1945, when the region was occupied by the Yugoslav army, Marchionne's parents moved to Chieti in Abruzzo, where Sergio was born.

At 13, Marchionne emigrated with his family to Toronto, Ontario, Canada, where they had relatives. Carrying dual Canadian and Italian citizenship, he spoke fluent English, French and Italian. Marchionne was a Canadian certified general accountant (FCGA), barrister, and a fellow of the Certified General Accountants of Ontario.

Marchionne attended St. Michael's College School, before completing his undergraduate studies in philosophy at the University of Toronto and earning a bachelor of commerce degree (1979) and an MBA (1985) from the University of Windsor as well as a law degree from Osgoode Hall Law School of York University (1983). He received an honorary doctorate from Walsh College (2013).

== Career ==
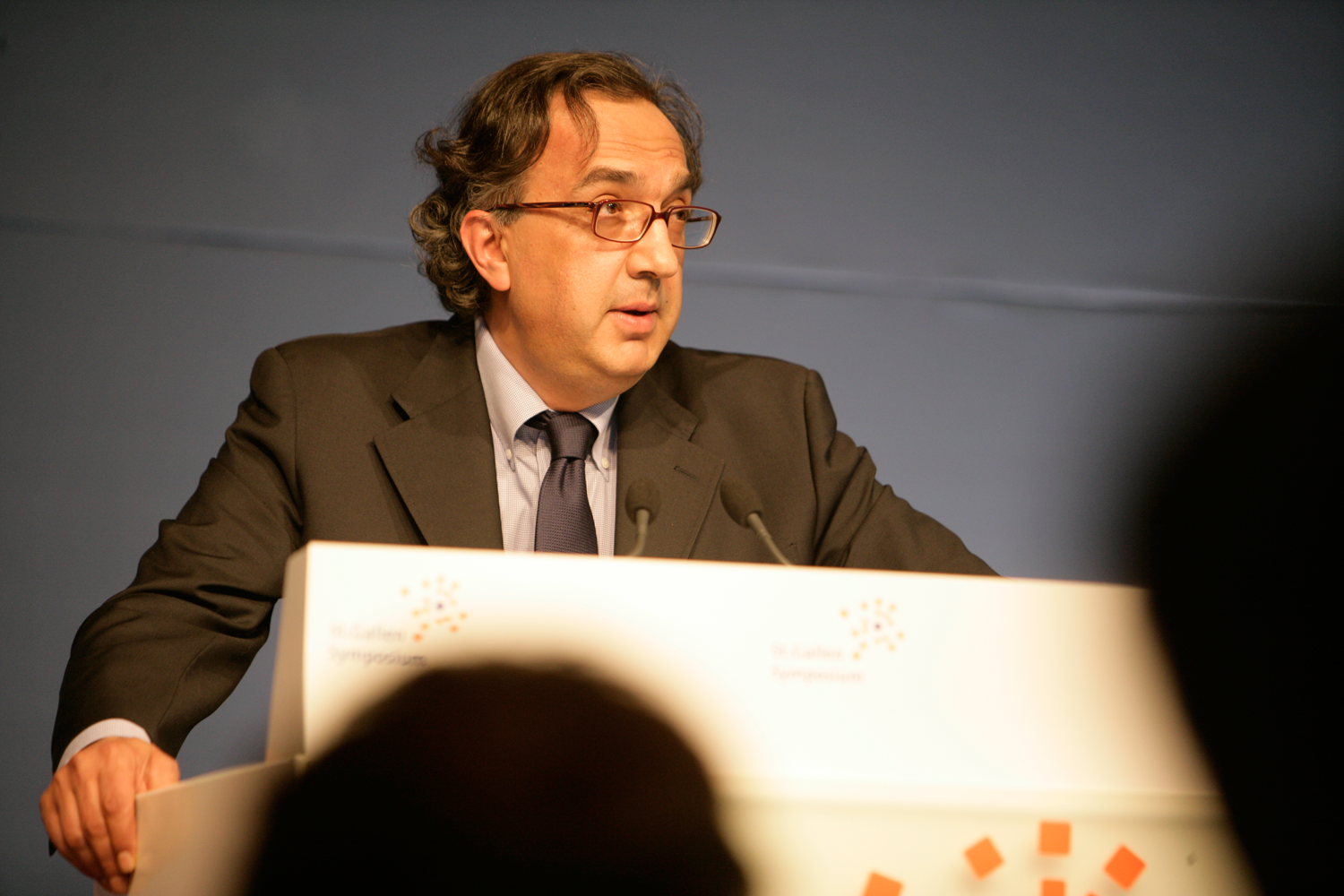
Marchionne in 2006

From 1983 to 1985, he worked as an accountant and tax specialist for Deloitte & Touche in Canada. From 1985 to 1988, he was Group Controller and then Director of Corporate Development at the Lawson Mardon Group in Toronto. In 1989, he moved to Glenex Industries where he worked for two years as executive vice president.

From 1990 to 1992, he was Vice President of Finance and Chief Financial Officer at Acklands Ltd. Between 1992 and 1994, he served as Vice President of Legal and Corporate Development and Chief Financial Officer of the Lawson Group, which was acquired by Alusuisse Lonza (Algroup) in 1994.

From 1994 to 2000, he worked at Algroup (Alusuisse Lonza Group Limited) based in Zürich, where he became chief executive officer in 1997. He then took the helm of the Lonza Group in Basel, after its spin-off from Algroup, serving first as chief executive officer and managing director (2000–2001) and then as chairman (2002).

In February 2002, he became chief executive officer and managing director of SGS S.A. of Geneva where, in March 2006, he was appointed chairman. Marchionne was elected as an independent member of the board of directors of Fiat S.p.A. in May 2003, until being appointed CEO in 2004.

=== Chrysler ===
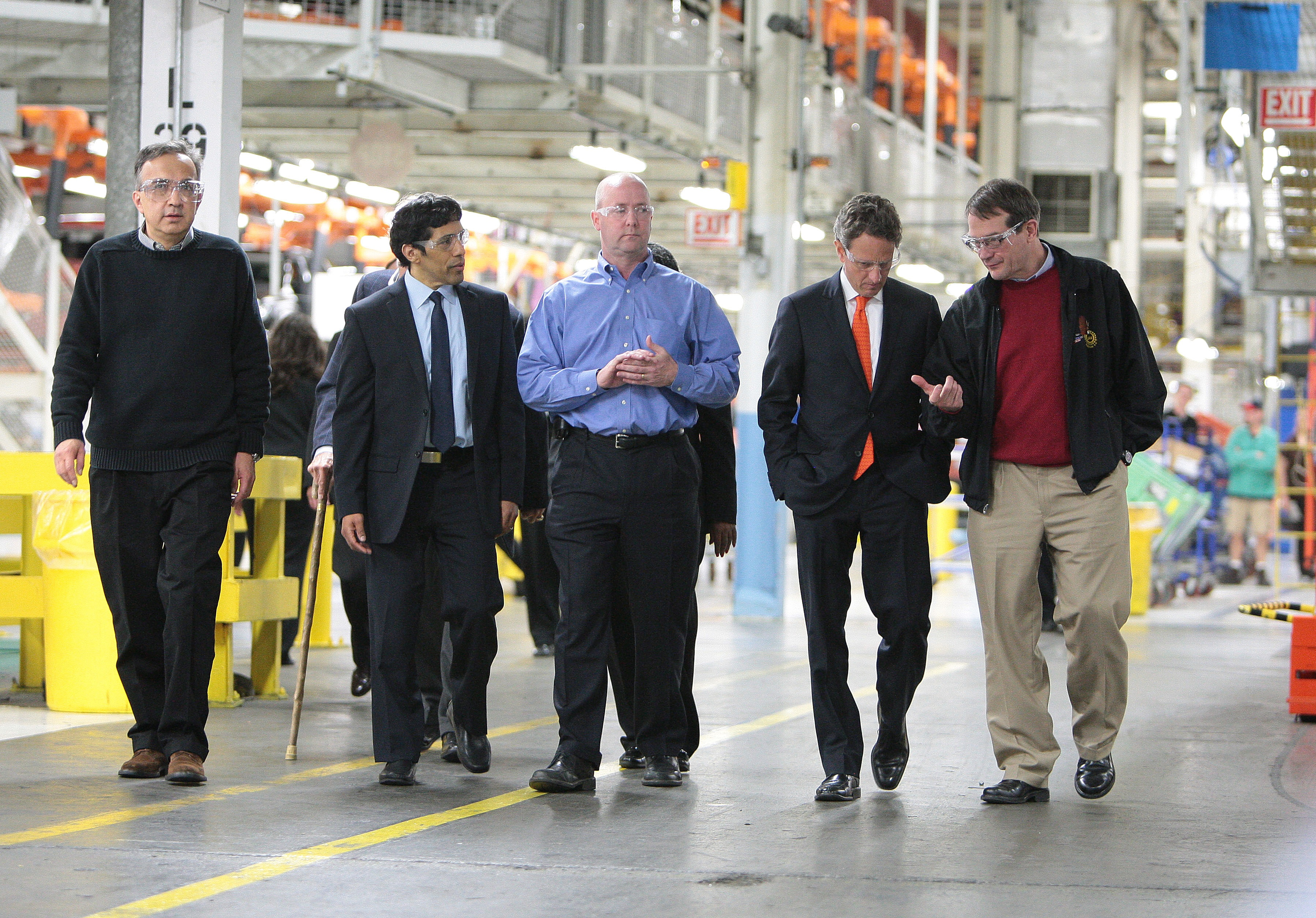
From left to right, Chrysler Group CEO Sergio Marchionne, Congressman Hansen Clarke (MI-13), Plant Manager Pat Walsh, US Treasury Secretary Tim Geithner, and UAW President Bob King on a tour of Jefferson North Assembly Plant (JNAP) in Detroit in April 2011

In June 2009, when Chrysler emerged from Chapter 11 bankruptcy protection, Fiat Group received a 20% stake in Chrysler Group LLC and Marchionne was appointed CEO, replacing Robert Nardelli.

In February 2011 Marchionne sparked widespread controversy in the US when he remarked at the J.D. Power & Associates International Automotive Roundtable that Chrysler's bail-out loans from the U.S. government carried "shyster rates". Marchionne immediately issued a public apology, stating "I regret the remark and consider it inappropriate" and going on to explain that "As the only parties willing to underwrite the risk associated with Chrysler's recovery plan, the two governments [U.S. and Canadian] levied interest rates that, although appropriate at the time, are above current market conditions." In July 2011, following the purchase of the ownership interests held by Canada and the US Treasury, Fiat's stake in Chrysler increased to 53.5% and in September 2011, Marchionne was also elected Chairman of Chrysler. Fiat and Chrysler officially merged on 1 August 2014.

Following the 2015 Volkswagen emissions scandal, in January 2017, the EPA also accused Fiat Chrysler of installing software that allowed excess diesel emissions to go undetected in their EcoDiesel engines. Marchionne denied any wrongdoing. He was critical of the EPA and rejected comparisons between Fiat Chrysler and Volkswagen.

== Death ==
Marchionne last appeared in public on 26 June 2018 in Rome, when he presented a Jeep to the Carabinieri, Italy's military police. FCA subsequently announced Marchionne had taken medical leave for shoulder surgery at the University Hospital of Zürich in Switzerland — adding on the day of surgery that he would not return due to post-surgical complications. After further serious complications, on 21 July 2018, Marchionne resigned from all his positions and was replaced at FCA, Ferrari, SGS and CNH.

He died on 25 July 2018 at age 66, most likely from complications related to underlying cancer. Some reports claimed he had suffered from an invasive shoulder cancer. According to the University Hospital of Zürich, Marchionne had been treated for a "serious illness" for over a year before his death, which was also noted by his partner's father Pier Luigi Battezzato. He had also quit smoking since his treatment started. FCA did not have knowledge of his health condition until just weeks before his death.

He was survived by his partner Manuela Battezzato, his two adult sons, Alessio and Tyler, and his former wife Orlandina.

== Public image ==
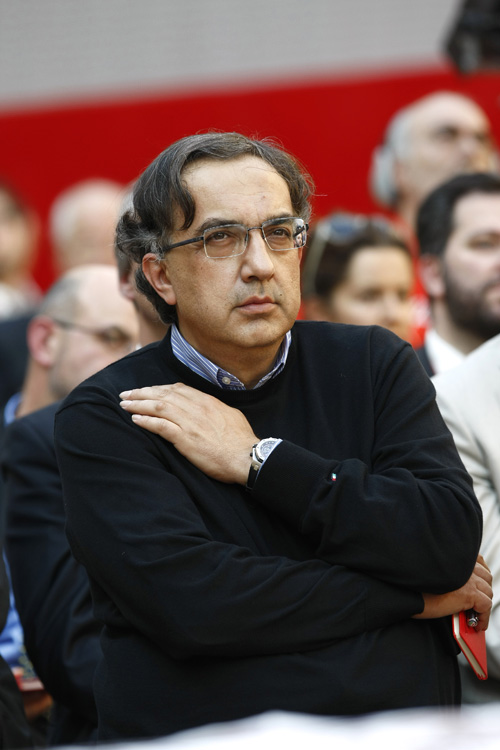
Marchionne wearing his classic black woolen sweater

Marchionne earned a reputation for an outspoken and often blunt approach.

Despite the buttoned-down business world in which he worked, Marchionne disliked having to think about his wardrobe, and became known for wearing black sweaters and jeans — keeping a supply of both in each of his residences. On 1 June 2018, Marchionne wore a necktie to celebrate the FCA debt repayment. Reporters noted that he had not been seen wearing a tie since 2007.

In a 2009 Forbes interview, Massimo Vecchio, an analyst with Mediobanca, commented on the contrast and Marchionne's controversial management style:

"He's got a lot of American in his management style. The only thing that matters to him is results. If you don't deliver, you are out. He is quite ruthless. When Marchionne took over the company [Fiat], he was literally firing one manager a day but there was a leadership problem and nobody wanted to take hard decisions. The communication from bottom to top in management was slow and wrong. He also changed that. He reduced the layers of management and gave his role a more direct view of what the business was doing. And of course his ego is very big and sometimes people who had clashes with him were basically fired. Looking at his style from outside it seems awful, but he delivered."

He was a chain-smoker until a year before his death.

== Legacy ==
The Istituto Sergio Marchionne high school was opened in Amatrice on 6 November 2019 by John Elkann, CEO of Ferrari. It was rebuilt after the August 2016 Central Italy earthquake, financed largely by the sale of the 500th LaFerrari.

== Honors and awards ==
- Cavaliere del Lavoro – 1 June 2006
- 2005, Honorary Doctor of Laws from the University of Windsor (Canada)
- 2007, Masters honoris causa from the CUOA Foundation (Italy)
- 2007, Degree in Economics honoris causa from the Università degli Studi di Cassino
- 2008, he received a degree ad honorem in Industrial Engineering and Management from Polytechnic University of Turin (Italy)
- Honorary Doctor of Business Administration from the University of Toledo (Ohio), 8 May 2011
- 2010, Marchionne was awarded the Premio Pico della Mirandola.
- 2011, Marchionne was awarded The Deming Cup 2011 for operational excellence presented by W. Edwards Deming Center at Columbia Business School.
- 2011, The Business Council for International Understanding honored Marchionne with the Dwight D. Eisenhower Leadership Award
- 2015, Marchionne was awarded the Hennick Medal for Career Achievement at Osgoode Hall Law School, York University by The Hennick Centre for Business and Law.
- 2015, Marchionne SAE Foundation Industry Leadership Award, when being was CEO of Fiat Chrysler Automobiles (FCA) and Chairman of CNH Industrial N.V. The award of 2016 has been recognized to Mark Fields, chief executive officer of Ford Motor Company.
- 2017, Marchionne received a degree honoris causa in Mechatronics Engineering from the University of Trento (Italy)
- 2019, World Car Person of the Year, presented at the Geneva Motor Show on 5 March 2019
- 2019, Inducted into the Automotive Hall of Fame on 18 July 2019

== See also ==
- Carlos Tavares, noted as Marchionne's unofficial heir, having engineered a similar turnaround at PSA Group, which later merged with FCA to form Stellantis.
- Carlos Ghosn, CEO who led a turnaround at Nissan.
- Lee Iacocca, CEO who led a previous turnaround at Chrysler.
- Alan Mulally, CEO who led a previous turnaround at Ford.
