= Professional accounting body =

Organization

A professional accounting body is an organization or association of accountants in a particular jurisdiction. Usually a person needs to be a member of such professional body to hold out to the public of the jurisdiction as an accountant. The designations for qualified accountants vary from jurisdiction to jurisdiction, such as Cost and Management Accountant (CMA), Chartered Accountant (CA), Chartered Certified Accountant (CCA), Chartered Professional Accountant (CPA), Certified Public Accountant (CPA), Certified Practising Accountant (CPA), Certified Management Accountant (CMA), Chartered Management Accountant (CGMA) or Chartered Public Finance Accountant (CPFA).

Some countries have a single professional accounting body while others have several. If there is more than one body, such bodies may or may not compete with each other; in some countries, professional accounting bodies are divided according to their field of activity.
