= Global Accounting Alliance =

The Global Accounting Alliance (GAA) is an international coalition of accounting organisations that was formed in 2006.

The GAA aims to promote standards of quality professional services, support their members, and share information and collaborate on international accounting issues. The members of the alliance represent over 775,000 of professional accountants.

The GAA provides members with a GAA Passport which provides access to other member bodies so they can access restricted areas of the local institute website, training and development, and publications at member rates when visiting their country.

== Member organisations ==
- Australia - Chartered Accountants Australia and New Zealand (CAANZ)
- United States of America - American Institute of Certified Public Accountants (AICPA)
- New Zealand - Chartered Accountants Australia and New Zealand (CAANZ)
- Canada - CPA Canada
- South Africa - South African Institute of Chartered Accountants (SAICA)
- Ireland - Chartered Accountants Ireland
- Scotland - Institute of Chartered Accountants of Scotland (ICAS)
- Hong Kong - Hong Kong Institute of Certified Public Accountants (HKICPA)
- England and Wales - Institute of Chartered Accountants in England & Wales (ICAEW)
- Japan - Japanese Institute of Certified Public Accountants (JICPA)
- Germany - Institut der Wirtschaftsprüfer in Deutschland (IDW)
