= Certified General Accountants Association of Canada =

Canadian accounting association (1913–2019)

- Formerly: General Accountants Association (1913–1982)
- Founded: 6 June 1913
- Defunct: 21 February 2019
- Fate: Merged with the Canadian Institute of Chartered Accountants and Certified Management Accountants of Canada
- Successor: CPA Canada

The Certified General Accountants Association of Canada serves Certified General Accountants and students in Canada and nearly 100 countries. CGA-Canada established the designation's certification requirements and professional standards, offers professional development, conducts research and advocacy, and represents CGAs nationally and internationally. CGA-Canada joined the Chartered Professional Accountants of Canada (CPA Canada) to integrate operations under the CPA banner in 2015. CPA Canada is the new national accounting body formed by the merger of the Canadian Institute of Chartered Accountants (CICA) and the Society of Certified Management Accountants (CMA) in 2013, and now Certified General Accountants.

In October 2008, 2009, 2010, 2011, 2012 and 2013 CGA-Canada was named one of "Canada's Top 100 Employers" by Mediacorp Canada Inc., CGA-Canada has also been named one of "BC's Top Employers" and one of "Canada's Greenest Employers".

== History ==
The national association, first known as the Canadian Accountants' Association, was founded in 1908 by a trio of Canadian Pacific Railway accountants in Montreal, Quebec. Five years later, in 1913, the General Accountants' Association, as it was then known, was granted a charter from the government of Canada. By the mid-1940s, association chapters were established from coast-to-coast. Provincial, territorial and regional (offshore) chapters were later established under their own charters.

Auditing rights are regulated by provincial governments. In Prince Edward Island, only qualified CAs and CGAs can perform public accounting and auditing in accordance with the Public Accounting and Auditing Act. In all other provinces, except Quebec and Ontario (detailed below), only qualified CAs, CGAs, and CMAs (Certified Management Accountants) may audit public companies.

- 1948 Bilingual origins: Examinations are offered in English and French in Quebec. The move to a bilingual organization is underway.
- 1950s CGA-British Columbia and the University of British Columbia's School of Commerce develop an innovative five-year extension program, available on campus or by correspondence. The program is later adopted in other jurisdictions and becomes a national curriculum standard.
- 1964 Education program goes international: The education program is extended to the Caribbean and Bermuda.
- 1974 Code of Ethics enshrined: CGA-Canada approves what would become the Code of Ethical Principles and Rules of Conduct.
- 1977 Founding member of IFAC: CGA-Canada becomes a founding member of the International Federation of Accountants (IFAC).
- 1982 Name change to the Certified General Accountants Association of Canada.
- 1988 John Leslie's award: The John Leslie Award is established in honour of the association's founding president and Chair, and recognizes exceptional service.
- 1987-1991 Competency-based accounting education: A major revision of the CGA education program is completed. Competency-based objectives, management emphasis and integration of ethics and information technology become hallmarks of the revised program.
- 1998 Degree required: CGAs are now required to obtain a bachelor's degree prior to certification. Partnerships are developed with universities to provide distance-learning options.
- 2003 Asian links secured: CGA-Hong Kong is granted affiliate status. CGA education materials are offered at more than a dozen Chinese universities.
- 2013 Unifying the accounting profession: CGA-Canada entered into an Integration Agreement with CPA Canada, the body responsible for the new national designation Chartered Professional Accountant.
- 2014 Unification completes in October 2014.

Historically Quebec and Ontario only allowed CAs to audit public companies. In 2004, the Ontario government passed legislation that would enable CAs, CGAs and CMAs to practice public accounting under a reconstituted Public Accountants Council, and as of June 2010 Ontario CGAs were allowed to issue audit opinions.

In August 2005, a panel was constituted under the Agreement on Internal Trade (AIT) to rule on a challenge filed by CGA New Brunswick and CGA-Canada. It found Quebec's measures denying CGAs the right to practice public accounting in Quebec to impair trade and recommended legislative changes. The Quebec government committed to address the problem. By November 2009, the 'Regulation respecting the public accountancy permit of the Ordre des comptables généraux accrédités du Québec' enabled qualified CGAs to offer the full range of public accounting services to for-profit and publicly listed companies.

On November 6, 2009, Ontario issued a Notice of Measure claiming that material differences exist in respect of the practice of public accounting in Canada and to protect consumers out of province public accountants would be assessed against Ontario's requirements. Manitoba supported by Alberta, British Columbia and Saskatchewan objected on the grounds that the Ontario regime causes injury to CGAs and impairs internal trade. A Panel convened under the Agreement on Internal Trade reviewed submissions and held a public hearing in Toronto on November 29, 2011. The Panel found that Ontario's notice of measure has impaired or would impair internal trade and has caused or would cause injury. The Panel recommended that Ontario comply with its AIT obligations by April 15, 2012. The outcome is important for CGAs because it removes the last barrier to mobility, allowing CGAs to practice anywhere in Canada.

In November 2008, Dr. Catherine Boivie was appointed to the Board of Directors as the Public Representative. Based in British Columbia, Dr. Boivie is the chief executive officer of Inventure Solutions and senior vice-president of information technology (IT) and facilities at Vancity, Canada's largest credit union.

In October 2013, CGA-Canada entered into an Integration Agreement with CPA Canada, the body responsible for the new national designation Chartered Professional Accountant. This followed most provincial CGA bodies ratifying the unification of the accounting profession in Canada.

== Education ==
CGA-Canada's professional education program is competency-based. Competency-based education requires candidates to perform tasks and roles to standards expected in the workplace.

The knowledge, skills and professional values required of a CGA are reflected in a list of competencies. These competencies extend over three areas: professionalism, leadership and professional knowledge. They are validated periodically through extensive survey analysis. The CGA Competency Framework details the 130 competencies required of a newly certified CGA.

The complete academic program consists of 19 courses, two business cases, and professional qualification exams, spread over several levels: Levels 1 to 3 (Foundation Studies), Level 4 (Advanced Studies), and final level, the PACE qualification or certification level.

A CGA must have an undergraduate degree. Students normally require 36 months of supervised work experiences, but in all cases they require a minimum of 24 months. They may meet the experience requirements in any business sector and in a variety of fields.

Before issuing audit opinions a CGA must first be licensed as a public accountant. The requirements for licensing include at least 500 public accounting hours per year.

CGA is recognized in 170+ countries through their partnership with ACCA.

== Online learning ==
CGA-Canada has been providing online professional accounting education. Via the Internet, students can complete their studies using a system that integrates text material, study guides, video and audio tools, discussion forums, group case study and project work, web research and email.

Introduced in 2011, Professional Experience Required for Certification (PERC) is the national reporting process for students in the CGA program. With PERC, students can document their experiences online and submit it annually.

In addition to its own online program of studies, CGA-Canada has also developed online degree partnerships with several Canadian universities.

== Research ==
CGA-Canada develops research and supports positions with a view to influence social policy, regulation and standards-setting.

This initiative has resulted in the following research items.

- IFRS Adoption in Canada: An Empirical Analysis of the Impact on Financial Statements (October 2013)
- Empirical Testing of the Momentum Effect in Canadian Capital Markets (June 2013)
- Money Talks: Emphasizing Wealth in Household Finances (May 2013)
- Issue in Focus — Is the Capital Cost Allowance System in Canada Unnecessarily Complex? (April 2013)
- Informed View — Mobile Payments in Canada – The Demand Side of the Equation (March 2013)
- Youth Unemployment in Canada: Challenging Conventional Thinking? (October 2012)
- Informed View — Starting Early – A Way to Improved Financial Literacy (September 2012)
- Informed View — Canada's Immigration System — Short-term Solutions May Impede Long-term Prosperity (July 17, 2012)
- Issue in Focus — Labour Shortages in Skilled Trades — The Best Guestimate? (July 17, 2012)
- Informed View — Regulating Sustainability Reporting – Is a Mandatory Approach Better than a Voluntary One? (Dec 20, 2011)
- Does Canada Have a Problem with Occupational Fraud? (Dec 6, 2011)
- Issue in Focus — Planning for Retirement – There is No Substitute (Nov 2, 2011)
- Informed View — The Bank of Canada's Overnight Rate – As Low and as Long as Needed (Oct 5, 2011)
- Issue in Focus — The Need for Tax Simplification – A Challenge and an Opportunity (Aug 10, 2011)
- A Driving Force No More: Have Canadian Consumers Reached Their Limits? (Jun 14, 2011)
- Issue in Focus — Can We Get Better for Less? Value for Money in Canadian Health Care (May 11, 2011)
- The Effects of IFRS on Financial Ratios: Early Evidence in Canada (Mar 16, 2011)
- Issue in Focus — MD&A – Counterpart to or Distraction from Financial Reporting (Jan 17, 2011)
- Small and Medium-Sized Enterprises: Rebuilding a Foundation for Post-Recovery Growth (Dec 7, 2010)
- Small and Medium-Sized Enterprises — Country Focus: Canada (Dec 7, 2010)
- Informed View — Shifting the Burden of Health Care Costs – Where To? (Nov 18, 2010)
- Laying the Foundation for a National Entrepreneurship Strategy: The CGA Entrepreneurship Report (Oct 18, 2010)
- Informed View — Living Standards – Measure it Right (Jul 29, 2010)
- 0CPA Australia/CGA-Canada: Report of the Forum on SME Issues — Unlocking the potential of the SME Sector (Jul 14, 2010)
- Issue in Focus — Registered Education Savings Plans – Valuable Opportunities for the Students of Tomorrow (Jun 24, 2010)
- Where Is the Money Now: The State of Canadian Household Debt as Conditions for Economic Recovery Emerge (May 11, 2010)
- Gauging the Path of Private Canadian Pensions: 2010 Update on the State of Defined Benefit and Defined Contribution Pension Plans (Apr 30, 2010)
- Earnings Quality Differential Between Canadian and U.S. Public Companies (Mar 31, 2010
- Issue in Focus — Fair Value Accounting: The Road to Be Most Travelled (January 2010)
- The Public Underwriting of Private Debt:The Prospect of Industry Targeting (December 2009)
- Where Has the Money Gone: The State of Canadian Household Debt in a Stumbling Economy (May 2009)
- The Federal Budget Surplus: Surprise or Strategy? (July 2008)
- Where Does the Money Go: The Increasing Reliance on Household Debt in Canada (October 2007)
- Fading Productivity: Making Sense of Canada's Productivity Challenge (May 2007)
- Tackling Compliance: Small Business and Regulation in Canada (October 2006)
- Demystifying Income Trusts (March 2006)
- The State of Defined-Benefit Pension Plans in Canada: An Update (November 2005)
- Measuring Up: A Study on Corporate Sustainability Reporting in Canada (June 2005)
- Growing Up: The Social and Economic Implications of an Aging Population (January 2005)
- Addressing the Pensions Dilemma in Canada (June 2004)

== Mutual recognition agreements ==
In December 2006, CGA-Canada and the Association of Chartered Certified Accountants (ACCA) announced a mutual recognition agreement (MRA) to take effect on 1 January 2007. This agreement was renewed in 2011.

In April 2008, CGA-Canada and CPA Australia entered into a MRA to extend the global reach of both organizations into new continents.

In June 2009, CGA-Canada and CPA Ireland entered into a mutual recognition agreement. The MRA establishes a strategic partnership between the two leading accounting organizations and gives members the opportunity to qualify for another designation.

In June 2010, CGA-Canada and the Ordre des Experts-Comptables, France's foremost accounting organization, have entered into a MRA. Under this accord, CGAs and members of the CSOEC can be considered for membership by the other body.

The association is a member of the International Federation of Accountants (IFAC).

CGA-Canada is an affiliate of the Institute of Chartered Accountants of the Caribbean and is a member of the International Federation of Francophone Accountants (FIDEF).

== Leadership ==
Presidents of the Association were:

- 1908–10 – J. Leslie
- 1911–12 – H. R. Mallinson
- 1913 – J. Leslie
- 1914 – W. W. Finlayson
- 1915 – F. J. Walker
- 1916–18 – J. Thurston Smith
- 1919 – D. Smith
- 1920 – E. C. Baker
- 1921 – H. F. Kerrin
- 1922 – A. J. M. Petrie
- 1923 – L. Bélanger
- 1924 – M. J. Smith
- 1925 – L. P. Lortie
- 1926 – T. H. Franklin
- 1927 – A. M. Reaper
- 1928 – L. P. Morin
- 1929 – E. E. Read
- 1930 – L. Joubert
- 1931 – W. R. Stevens
- 1932 – L. E. Barry
- 1933 – W. H. Moffit
- 1934 – H. A. Tipple
- 1935 – K. G. Pendock
- 1936 – J. H. Weeden
- 1937 – W. Bentley
- 1938 – G. P. Fairbain
- 1939 – A. S. Keiller
- 1940 – A. Hutchinson
- 1941 – G. Choquette
- 1942 – H. P. Dorval
- 1943 – W. R. Leavitt
- 1944 – R. M. Horning
- 1945 – F. D. Clark
- 1946–47 – L. A. Inkster
- 1948 – A. Dolbec
- 1949 – J. W. Parkinson
- 1950 – J. M. McDonald
- 1951 – F. W. Dollman
- 1952 – T. J. F. Reynolds
- 1953–54 – E. A. Hayhurst
- 1955 – J. V. Willis
- 1956 – W. C. McCalpin
- 1957 – L. Rubin
- 1958 – C. Legaré
- 1959 – C. F. Leach
- 1960 – H. A. Stevens
- 1961 – J. A. Bryant
- 1962 – J. L. Jarest
- 1963 – E. A. Hendry
- 1964 – W. T. Mann
- 1965 – K. E. Rannie
- 1966 – F. M. Hoar
- 1967 – J. S. Dow
- 1968 – J. E. Spry
- 1969 – J. D. Scott
- 1970 – E. Maheux
- 1971 – J. P. Janes
- 1972 – J. Cornwell
- 1973 – R. G. Martin
- 1974 – C. C. Brown
- 1975 – B. Massé
- 1976 – L. A. D. Bartrum
- 1977 – B. F. Adams
- 1978 – J. M. Parker
- 1979 – D. H. Page
- 1980 – G. Sinotte
- 1981 – J. L. Denholme
- 1982 – D. A. Savidant
- 1983 – D. Chochinov
- 1984 – M. W. Caplan
- 1985 – W. N. Perrault
- 1986 – P. A. Malo
- 1987 – E. J. Boudreau
- 1988 – W. J. Mercer

== See also ==
- Canadian accounting profession
- Certified General Accountants of Ontario
- Certified General Accountant
- Chartered Professional Accountant
