= Lebanese Association of Certified Public Accountants =

Professional association

The Lebanese Association of Certified Public Accountants (LACPA), in the Republic of Lebanon, was created by the Accountancy Profession Act No. 364/1994 to become the sole organization in Lebanon representing more than 1711 members of the CPA profession as of May 2011. LACPA is an active member of the International Federation of Accountants (IFAC), Federation Internationale des Experts-Comptables Francophone (FIDEF) and Arab Federation for Accountants and Auditors (AFAA), a federation of the Joint Arab Economic Action Charter of the Arab League.

== Aims ==
LACPA, and through its acting committees formed by a council of 10 professionals elected every 2 years, establishes national standards on ethics, auditing, accounting education and accounting practices. It also issues guidance to encourage high-quality performance by professional accountants.

== Personnel ==
The LACPA Council is composed of 10 members headed by the chairman elected every 2 years. The LACPA administrative and technical body is headed by a secretary general.
