= Ordre National des Experts Comptables et Comptables Agréés du Sénégal =

Professional organization of accountants in Senegal

- Abbreviation: ONECCA
- Formation: February 10, 2000; 26 years ago
- Headquarters: Senegal
- Region served: Senegal
- Official language: French
- President: Mamour Fall
- Website: www.onecca.sn

The Ordre National des Experts Comptables et Comptables Agréés du Sénégal (ONECCA) or National Institute of Chartered Accountants of Senegal is a professional body in Senegal created on 10 January 2000.

ONECCA is a member of the Association of Accountancy Bodies in West Africa (ABWA), the International Federation of Accountants (IFAC) and the International Federation of Francophone Accountants. ONECCA was a strong supporter of the Pan-African Federation of Accountants (PAFA), a project started in November 2006 and finally announced in May 2011. According to Abdou Aziz Dieye of ONECCA, promotion of international standards by PAFA would not just improve security of investments but would also help policymakers.

ONECCA has frequently expressed support for Small and Medium Enterprises (SMEs). This was a key topic discussed with IFAC President Graham Ward during a July 2006 visit. In a May 2011 workshop, the head of ONECCA called for measures such as investment clubs in school to make owners of small and medium enterprises aware that funding can be obtained through the stock exchange, not just the banks. Despite the importance of its work, ONECCA is little known. The president has said that this is appropriate given the nature of the profession.
