= Chartered Accountants Australia and New Zealand =

Accountant association in Australia and New Zealand

- Abbreviation: CA ANZ
- Predecessor: Institute of Chartered Accountants Australia and New Zealand Institute of Chartered Accountants
- Formation: 31 December 2014; 11 years ago
- Legal status: Registered Body (in Australia)
- Headquarters: Sydney, Australia
- Region served: Australia and New Zealand
- Members: 140,590 (2025)
- President: Naomi Walsh FCA (2026)
- Board Chair: John Palermo FCA
- Chief Executive Officer: Ainslie van Onselen
- Revenue: ▲AUD $141.03 million (2020)
- Expenses: ▲AUD $138.77 million (2020)
- Staff: 500
- Website: www.charteredaccountantsanz.com

Chartered Accountants Australia and New Zealand (CA ANZ) is a professional accounting body with more than 140,590 members in Australia, New Zealand and overseas. CA ANZ focuses on the education and learning of members and engages in advocacy and leadership in areas of public interest that impact the economy and markets.

CA ANZ operates across a network of 14 offices across six countries. CA ANZ is a member of the International Federation of Accountants (IFAC), the Global Accounting Alliance (GAA), and Chartered Accountants Worldwide (CAW) chaired by CA ANZ CEO Ainslie van Onselen. CA ANZ is an associate member of the ASEAN Federation of Accountants, a member of the Confederation of Asian and Pacific Accountants, and has an alliance with Association of Chartered Certified Accountants (ACCA).

CA ANZ is the only professional accounting organisation in Australia accredited as a higher education provider by TEQSA and the only organisation authorised to offer FEE-HELP loans to CA Program students.

As outlined in the Royal Charter, CA ANZ advocates in the public interest and engages with government regulators and standard setters on behalf of members and the profession.

== History ==
In November 2013 the majority of members from the Institute of Chartered Accountants Australia and the New Zealand Institute of Chartered Accountants voted yes on a proposal to create Chartered Accountants Australia and New Zealand.

NZICA originated in 1894 as the Incorporated Institute of Accountants of New Zealand. ICAA was formed in 1928 and was the first accounting body outside the UK to receive a Royal Charter.

The New Zealand Parliament passed the third and final reading of the Accounting Infrastructure Reform Bill (AIRB) on 30 October 2014.The Royal Charter and By-laws for Chartered Accountants Australia and New Zealand were approved and signed by Peter Cosgrove, Governor-General of Australia on 26 November 2014. The legal structure of Chartered Accountants Australia and New Zealand, was formally implemented on 31 December 2014

== Governance ==
The CA ANZ Councillors are appointed by Regional Councils. The Council is responsible for appointing the Board and it advises the Board on key policies affecting members.

Regional Councils represent members in Australia and New Zealand by providing a voice for the members in their region and advising the Council on member issues.

The Board is the decision-making body. It operates on a corporate model and has oversight responsibility for the development and approval of strategy and performance including key policy issues and oversight of risk.

The Executive Team supports the CEO and is responsible for the operations and strategy implementation and delivery.

== Membership ==
=== Chartered Accountants ===
The Chartered Accountant (CA) designation denotes an accountant qualified to offer the range of accounting services privately and to the public.

=== Provisional Membership ===
CA ANZ grants provisional membership to members who have obtained a tertiary degree that is accredited by the organisation. Alternative pathways to provisional membership is available through the CA foundations program if the candidate does not possess an accredited degree. A provisional membership is required to begin the CA Program leadin to full membership.

=== CA Program ===
The CA Program combines a Graduate Diploma of Chartered Accounting (GradDipCA), consisting of nine subjects (seven core and two electives), with three years of Mentored Practical Experience. It involves a curriculum across areas that include finance, strategy, and business performance.

CA ANZ is the only professional accounting body in Australia accredited by the Tertiary Education Quality and Standards Agency (TEQSA) and approved by the Australian Government to offer FEE-HELP loans

The CA Program was refreshed in 2021 to develop business leaders. It focuses on technical and professional skills.

In 2025, CA ANZ refreshed its pathways to the CA designation, offering entry options for candidates from different backgrounds.

=== Direct pathway ===
The direct pathway is for candidates with an accredited accounting degree or a recognised equivalent, as assessed by CA ANZ. They can start the CA Program, which combines the Graduate Diploma of Chartered Accounting (GradDipCA) with three years of Mentored Practical Experience (MPE).

=== Alternate pathways ===
For aspiring accountants who do not hold an accredited accounting, commerce or finance degree, there are pathways to get to the starting line of the CA Program.

CA Fundamentals is open to high school graduates and after successful completion of this one-year program candidates progress to CA Foundations. CA Fundamentals is designed to build the foundation to take the first step toward becoming a Chartered Accountant.

CA Foundations is designed for people with three or more years of work or study experience, including degrees other than accounting, finance or commerce, or those who have studied at TAFE or Polytechnic. There are six CA Foundations papers and depending on study and work experience, candidates may qualify for CA Foundations study credits.

=== Accounting Technicians ===
The Accounting Technician (AT) designation is for individuals employed to oversee and manage financial accounts in roles such as Accounts Manager or Assistant Finance Manager. The AT designation is currently available in New Zealand only.

New Zealand practice is not followed in other countries. For example, in the United Kingdom, accounting technicians generally belong to the Association of Accounting Technicians.

=== Fellowship ===
Fellowships (FCA) are awards granted to CA ANZ members to recognise achievement and contribution to the profession. Notable fellows include Shelley Griffiths and Ros Whiting.

== Public practice ==
Chartered Accountants may apply for a Certificate of Public Practice. Every member who offers accounting services to the public must be a Chartered Accountant and hold a Certificate of Public Practice (CPP). The requirements for the issuing of this certificate are that (amongst others) a member must have had two years of acceptable practical experience while a member of the College of Chartered Accountants and have attended a course for new practitioners.

== Professional standing ==
CA ANZ protects the integrity of the profession and the CA designation by upholding professional standards and trust in the profession, monitoring conduct and ethics and resolving professional conduct complaints. It delivers technical training programs to ensure adherence to professional standards, By-Laws, NZICA Rules (for New Zealand members), and Codes of Ethics.

CA ANZ’s professional conduct and disciplinary process is designed to operate independently of management, ensuring fairness and transparency for both members and complainants. Complaints are assessed by the Professional Conduct Committee (PCC), which is composed of both CA ANZ members and independent lay members, including legal and ethics experts.

The PCC investigates complaints without influence from areas of CA ANZ, applying principles of procedure requirements and due process. Where misconduct is established, the PCC may determine to issue a reminder or caution, or if the matter is serious, propose a consent order or refer it to the Disciplinary Tribunal for determination.

In New Zealand, NZICA retains its non-delegable regulatory functions under the New Zealand Institute of Chartered Accountants Act 1996 (NZICA Act). NZICA regulates and supervises the conduct of CA ANZ members, including members whom NZICA, as an accredited body to Government, licenses under the Auditor Regulation Act 2011 and the Insolvency Practitioners Regulation Act 2019.

In March 2025, CA ANZ received approval of its Professional Standards Scheme (Scheme) from the Australian Professional Standards Councils. The Scheme takes effect from 13 July 2025 for a period of five years, and applies in all Australian states and territories by operation of the Professional Standards legislation. The Scheme is a statutory mechanism to cap occupational liability and ensure consumer protection through high professional standards and mandatory professional indemnity insurance.

== Professional Conduct Framework Review ==
In June 2023, CA ANZ released the Professional Conduct Framework Review (PCFR) Final Report, an Independent Review of recommendations, and the PCFR Committee's Response to the Independent Review of CA ANZ’s disciplinary framework, to ensure that CA ANZ’s independent disciplinary bodies operate under a fair framework with processes that serve both the interests of members and the public.

While the Professional Conduct Framework Review found the CA ANZ Conduct and Disciplinary Framework met or exceeded international peer benchmarks, it also found areas to strengthen.

In October 2023, CA ANZ members voted in favour of resolutions to strengthen the Professional Conduct Framework, including a significant increase in fines for firm events, establishing a former member jurisdiction in Australia, and voluntary firm membership in New Zealand.

== Mutual recognition ==
Chartered Accountants Australia and New Zealand have mutual recognition agreements with the following accounting entities as part of the Global Accounting Alliance:

- United States of America - American Institute of Certified Public Accountants (AICPA)
- Canada - CPA Canada
- South Africa - South African Institute of Chartered Accountants (SAICA)
- Ireland - Chartered Accountants Ireland
- Scotland - Institute of Chartered Accountants of Scotland (ICAS)
- Hong Kong - Hong Kong Institute of Certified Public Accountants (HKICPA)
- England and Wales - Institute of Chartered Accountants in England & Wales (ICAEW)
- India - Institute of Chartered Accountants of India (ICAI)

== See also ==
- International Federation of Accountants
