= Roy Megarry =

Canadian businessman and newspaper publisher (1937–2024)

Roy Megarry OC
- Born: Archibald Roy Megarry; 10 February 1937; Belfast, Northern Ireland
- Died: 18 November 2024 (aged 87); Port Perry, Ontario, Canada
- Known for: Publisher and CEO of The Globe and Mail

Archibald Roy Megarry, OC (10 February 1937 – 18 November 2024) was a Canadian businessman. He was the publisher and CEO of The Globe and Mail from 1978 to 1992. He was interim publisher from November 1993 to May 1994.

== Life and career ==
Born in Belfast, Northern Ireland, he received a Certified Management Accountant degree. He was a Controller for Honeywell Canada from 1957 to 1962. He worked for Daystrom (Heathkit) Ltd. from 1962 to 1964, before becoming a Senior Consultant for Coopers & Lybrand from 1964 to 1968. In 1968, he became a Vice President Finance for International Syscoms Ltd. and from 1972 to 1978, was a Vice President, Corporate Development for Torstar. In 1978, he was appointed publisher and CEO of The Globe and Mail. He later became Chairman.

Later, he helped develop the CARE Canada "Tools for Development" program, which sends used industrial equipment to small-scale entrepreneurs in Latin America.

In 1993, he was made an Officer of the Order of Canada. Megarry died in Port Perry, Ontario on 18 November 2024, at the age of 87.

== Sources ==
- "Canadian Who's Who 1997 entry".
