= Registered Professional Accountant =

Professional status for accountants in Canada

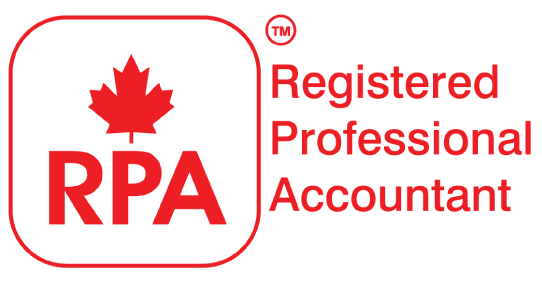
- Abbreviation: RPA
- Predecessor: The Canadian Institute of Accredited Public Accountants (APA)
- Headquarters: Mississauga, Canada
- Region served: Canada
- Official language: English
- President: Zubair Choudhry, RPA APA
- Board of directors: Paul Brosnan, RPA, Vice-President, James Green, RPA, Secretary, Naseem Qadir, RPA, Treasurer, Syed Warsi, RPA, CPA Director Alberta Office, Joseph Morgado, RPA, Director
- Website: https://rpacanada.org/

The Registered Professional Accountant (RPA) is a Canadian accounting designation granted by the Society of Professional Accountants of Canada (SPAC), a federally chartered non profit organization.

== History ==
The Canadian Institute of Accredited Public Accountants (CIAPA) was founded in 1938 and was granted letters patent under the provisions of Part II of the Canada Corporation Act on May 7, 1946. The Society of Professional Accountants of Canada (SPAC) was established in 1978. A Federal Charter was granted to the Society as a Corporation by letters patent under the Provision of Part II of the Canada Corporations Act. The CIAPA is the oldest accounting institution in Canada, and is now under the control of the Society.

== Description and requirements ==
The designation, which holds a federal certification mark for qualifying its members in the field of accounting, is independent and distinct from the Chartered Professional Accountant designation, with its own unique history and value within the Canadian accounting landscape. The RPA program requires completion of university or college courses set by SPAC and passing four Mandatory Professional Exams (MPE): Financial Accounting, Management Accounting, Taxation, and Data Analytics and Technology. The Registered Professional Accountant has five pathways to designation, making it an accessible choice for accounting students.

The Registered Professional Accountant (RPA) designation differs from the Chartered Professional Accountant (CPA) designation in its scope and focus. RPAs primarily serve small to medium-sized businesses, providing compilation engagements, forecasts, advisory, tax services, ESG (environmental social and governance) consulting, and bookkeeping. In contrast, CPAs offer similar services for larger entities and perform assurance engagements, including audits and reviews.

== Application process ==
A Chartered Professional Accountant (CPA) may apply for an RPA designation. A CPA in good standing will not have to write the MPE exams. In addition, a CPA with a practice certificate can transfer their practice certificate to be an RPA practitioner.

An RPA member must complete the Professional Practice Certification (PPC) program offered by the Society and apply for the Certified Accounting Practitioner (CAP) certification to start their professional accounting practice.

== Duties of Registered Professional Accountants ==
An RPA with a CAP Certification is trained and qualified to issue compilation engagement reports under either Canadian Standards for Related Services (CSRS 4200) issued by the Auditing & Assurance Standards Board (AASB), or where appropriate using the public-use International Standards on Related Services (ISRS 4410) issued by the International Auditing and Assurance Standards Board (IAASB), and to provide other services such as: filing personal and corporate tax returns, performing bookkeeping and accounting services, business consulting, technology, ESG (environmental, social, and governance) consulting and report preparation, and data analytics. In addition, RPA's in Ontario along with CPA's (Chartered Professional Accountants), Lawyers, and Paralegals are exclusively designated by the province as Official Intermediary Professional Organizations permitted to transact as intermediary organizations on behalf of business clients for corporate filings available on the Ontario Business Registry using the provincial portal.

An RPA with the Certified Accounting Practitioner certification can also apply as a Commissioner for Taking Affidavits with The Office of the Attorney General of Ontario.

RPA members without a Certified Accounting Practitioner (CAP) certification serve employers in small, medium, and large corporations, or the public service, in management accounting and related services, or working as an entrepreneur in different leadership roles in a variety of businesses.

In addition to performing Compilation Engagement Reports, the RPA qualifies to act as a Canadian Passport Guarantor.

== Recognition ==
In terms of global outreach and work in conjunction with international accounting bodies, Registered Professional Accountants (RPA) are recognized for admission as an associate member to the Institute of Certified Management Accountants (CMA) Australia, the Certified General Accountants of Pakistan (CGA), and the Zambia Institute of Chartered Accountants through mutual recognition agreements in place with RPA Canada. RPA's are also eligible to write the Forensic Certified Public Accountant exam offered by the Forensic CPA Society in the state of Washington, USA. Additionally, RPA Canada has entered into a mutual recognition agreement with Javeriana University in Columbia as part of ongoing work between the Columbian and Canadian accounting industries.

The RPA designation is recognized by the Ontario Government, Civil Service; Ontario Ministry of Education and Training; and Management Board of Ontario for employment purposes.

== Pathways to RPA Designation ==
=== College Pathway ===
Students with a College Diploma in Accounting and two years experience working in the accounting field will need the RPA Prerequisite Courses and to take the MPE Review Sessions, once these are complete students may apply to write the Mandatory Professional Exams (MPE) in Financial Accounting, Management Accounting, Taxation, and Data Analytics to earn the RPA Designation.

=== University Pathway ===
Students with a University Degree in Accounting and two years experience working in the accounting field may take the MPE Review Sessions and apply to write the Mandatory Professional Exams (MPE) in Financial Accounting, Management Accounting, Taxation, and Data Analytics to earn the RPA Designation.

=== Bookkeeper Practitioner Pathway ===
Individuals that have been operating their own practice as a bookkeeper for 5 years, or working with an accountant as a bookkeeper for 8 years, may take the RPA Prescribed Courses (Financial Accounting, Management Accounting, Canadian Business Law, Ethics, Canadian Income Tax I & II, and Data Analytics), and the MPE Review Sessions. Following these courses they may apply to write the Mandatory Professional Exams (MPE) in Financial Accounting, Management Accounting, Taxation, and Data Analytics to earn the RPA Designation.

=== Undesignated Accounting Practitioner Pathway ===
Accounting and tax professionals that have been operating their own accounting practice as an undesignated accountant for five or more years, and have relevant core accounting courses in their background, may take the MPE Review Sessions and write a fast-track Concise Mandatory Professional Exam, covering Financial Accounting, Management Accounting, Income Taxation, and Data Analytics, to earn the RPA designation. Following this, the fast-track program requires these practitioners to complete an education and training program to obtain a Certificate of Accounting Practice. As an RPA with a Certificate of Accounting Practice, the practitioner will be eligible to issue Compilation Engagement Reports in Canada, following the CSRS 4200 guidelines issued by the AASB.

=== Foreign Designated Accountant Pathway ===
Holders of recognized foreign accounting designations and with two years experience working in the accounting field may be granted the RPA designation and must complete Canadian Taxation I & II, Canadian Business Law, and Data Analytics courses within 18 months following admission as an RPA.

=== Professional Practice Certification (PPC) and the Certified Accounting Practitioner Program (CAP) ===
RPAs that complete the Certified Accounting Practitioner program will become a Certified Accounting Practitioner (CAP) and receive a Professional Practice Certificate (PPC) valid for a period of 5 years, after which time the certification must be renewed.

The CAP certification allows an RPA member to provide professional accounting services as an RPA practitioner for their clients.

These members operate accounting firms providing CSRS 4200 Compilation Year End Reports, Corporate T2 Tax filing, Bookkeeping and Related Professional Services.

The Certified Accounting Practitioner (CAP program) consists of an eight module course followed by two case study assignments (Case Study A and Case Study B), and an examination. After successful completion of the CAP program, the RPA member is certified through the society to operate their accounting practice.

== Academic Partners ==
- Algoma University
- McMaster University
- Sheridan College
- Durham College
- Northern College
- Georgian College
- Sault College

== RPA Prerequisite Courses ==
Entry Level

- Intermediate Financial Accounting I
- Introductory Management Accounting
- Management Information Systems
- Ethics in Workplace Skills

Technician

- Intermediate Financial Accounting II
- Intermediate Management Accounting
- Taxation I
- Financial Management

Professional

- Financial Reporting
- Taxation II
- Analytics and Big Data
- Business Law

Applied

- Audit and Internal Controls
- Accounting Systems
- Data Analytics for Accountants
- Emerging Trends in Fintech

== See also ==
- Chartered Professional Accountant
