= Certified Management Accountants of Canada =

Canadian accounting association (1920–2018)

- Formerly: Canadian Society of Cost Accountants (1920–30); Canadian Society of Cost Accountants and Industrial Engineers (1930–48); Society of Industrial and Cost Accountants of Canada (1948–68); Society of Industrial Accountants of Canada (1968–77)
- Founded: 3 May 1920
- Defunct: 21 March 2018
- Fate: Merged with the Canadian Institute of Chartered Accountants and Certified General Accountants Association of Canada
- Successor: CPA Canada

The Society of Management Accountants of Canada (French: La Société des comptables en management du Canada), also known as Certified Management Accountants of Canada (French: Comptables en management accrédités du Canada) and CMA Canada, awards the Certified Management Accountant designation in Canada.

== Activities ==
Until September 2015, CMA Canada, through its provincial and territorial affiliates, granted the CMA professional designation in accounting and was responsible for standards-setting, accreditation and the continuing professional development of CMAs.

CMAs applied expertise in accounting, management and strategy to ensure corporate accountability and help organizations maintain a long-term competitive advantage. In that regard, CMA Canada offered executive development programs, online courses, and knowledge management publications.

Management Accounting Guidelines and Management Accounting Practices were published by CMA Canada to specify the best practice on key topics in management accounting. They were available for download free of charge or on CD for a nominal charge to CMAs, and could be purchased by non-members. CPA Canada has taken over the programme, and has issued update guidance for many such matters under its own name, although none of the documents appear to acknowledge their SMAC origins.

From 1953 to 2015, the Society operated a foundation that was dedicated to furthering research in the field of management accounting.

== History of the Society ==
The mission of the Society has closely tracked the evolution from cost accounting to management accounting in Canada, and its distinction from financial accounting:

- 1920 - Incorporation of The Canadian Society of Cost Accountants, with head office in Hamilton, Ontario
- 1926 - Introduction of Cost and Management, the predecessor of CMA Magazine
- 1930 - Name changed to The Canadian Society of Cost Accountants and Industrial Engineers
- 1941 - Formation of provincial societies in Ontario and Quebec, with the power to grant the newly established professional designation of Registered Industrial Accountant ("RIA")
- 1948 - Name changed to Society of Industrial and Cost Accountants of Canada
- 1968 - Name changed to The Society of Industrial Accountants of Canada
- 1977 - Name changed to The Society of Management Accountants of Canada
- 1985 - Introduction of the professional designation of Certified Management Accountant ("CMA"), with existing RIAs being grandfathered in
- 2004 - CMA is registered as a trademark by CMA Canada
- 2006 - Certified Management Accountant is registered as a trademark by CMA Canada
- 2007 - Incorporation of the CMA Canada Research Foundation
- 2009 - Introduction of The National Standard for Public Accounting for Certified Management Accountants to govern the affairs of CMAs that have entered into public practice
- 2014 - Unification of the profession within CPA Canada, with legislative implementation substantially complete as of May 2017.

=== Timeline ===
Certificate of efficiency
Registered Industrial Accountant (Note: The designation was created once provincial societies began to be formed. Originally known as "Registered Industrial and Cost Accountant" or "RIA" in Ontario and "Licentiate of the Cost and Management Institute" or "LCMI" in Quebec, it was simplified in some, but not all, provinces around 1967.)
Certified Management Accountant
CPA
│
1900
│
1925
│
1950
│
1975
│
2000
│
2025

== Competencies, accreditation process and post-qualification development ==
CMAs are expected to undergo specific training and practical experience to achieve specified competencies in the area of strategic management accounting, which are intended to prepare them for senior leadership roles in their organizations. There are six functional competencies and four enabling competencies in that regard:

Functional competencies

- Strategic management
- Risk management and governance
- Performance management
- Performance measurement
- Financial management
- Financial reporting

Enabling competencies

- Problem solving and decision making
- Leadership and group dynamics
- Professionalism and ethical behaviour
- Communication

While candidates may come from a variety of backgrounds, the CMA career path is expected to progress in the following manner:

Stage	Phase	Nature
Acquisition	Prior to passage of CMA Entrance Examination	In process of completing undergraduate studies, or 5–7 years thereafter. Already in junior to middle management level in their organization.
Basic Proficiency	Acquisition of the CMA designation and the following five years thereafter	Already in middle management level, and progressively gaining more practical experience and responsibility.
Advanced Proficiency	5–10 years post-qualification	Early- to mid-career professionals, with most having achieved more senior positions within the middle management layer. A significant number hold introductory senior management positions in their area of specialization or in the organization as a whole.
Mastery	10–25 years post-qualification	Late-career professionals, operating in senior management roles. Most are either the highest-ranking financial officers in their organization or financial professionals with specialized knowledge in particular functional areas. A significant proportion of individuals are operating in the desired "C" space - i.e., CEO, CFO, CRO or CIO - and some of these are leaders of large enterprises or significant strategic business units.

CMA candidates (without advanced professional standing) must have obtained a university degree and have credits in a specified list of subjects, before they can write the CMA Entrance Examination. Upon passing this stage, they then enter the Strategic Leadership Programme ("SLP"), which has the following components:

- Development Phase
  - followed by the successful passing of the CMA Case Examination
- Application Phase
  - leading to the successful preparation and presentation of the Board Report, containing detailed analysis and recommendations on a specified case study
- Completion of 24 months of relevant full-time progressive practical experience confirmed by the employer - of which at least 12 months must be concurrent with the SLP
  - Candidates are expected to be expanding their on-the-job responsibilities while undertaking the SLP

Successful passage of the above will result in the granting of the CMA designation. After attaining the designation, there are specified requirements for continuous professional learning and development that must be undertaken to remain in good standing.

== Notable members ==
- Navdeep Bains
- Peter G. Christie
- Rocky Dwyer
- Roy Megarry
- Frederick John Mitchell
- Harinder Takhar
- J. Grant Thiessen
- Rick Thorpe

== See also ==
- Canadian accounting profession
