= Ros Whiting =

New Zealand accountancy academic (1958–2024)

Rosalind Whiting
- Born: 3 March 1958; Eltham
- Died: 22 July 2024

Academic background
- Education: Eltham School, Merrilands School, Highlands Intermediate School, New Plymouth Girls' High School, University of Otago, University of Adelaide
- Thesis: Gender, family responsibilities and career success in the New Zealand accountancy profession (2006)

Rosalind Heather Whiting (3 March 1958 – 22 July 2024) was a New Zealand accounting academic, and was an associate professor at the University of Otago. She was elected a Fellow of the Chartered Accountants Australia and New Zealand in 2018.

== Early life and education ==
Whiting was born in Eltham, Taranaki, on 3 March 1958, and was one of six children of Jim and Isobel Whiting. Whiting attended Eltham Primary School before the family moved to New Plymouth, where she went to Merrilands Primary School, Highlands Intermediate and New Plymouth Girls’ High School. Despite initially intending to be a teacher, Whiting went on to take a Bachelor of Science in chemistry at the University of Otago, followed by a diploma in environmental studies from the University of Adelaide. She worked for the Ministry of Agriculture and Fisheries in Roxburgh, studying the Clyde Dam, before studying accounting at Otago, gaining a postgraduate diploma and a Master of Commerce.

== Academic career ==
Whiting joined the faculty of the University of Otago in 1991, rising to senior lecturer in 2003 and associate professor in 2016. She completed a PhD titled Gender, family responsibilities and career success in the New Zealand accountancy profession at the University of Otago in 2006.

Whiting was interested in the history of accounting, and gender and accounting careers, but also published on corporate finance and microfinance. Whiting was involved in a research study that found dropping levels of home ownership was reducing the likelihood of a comfortable retirement for an increasing number of people. In 2009 Whiting founded Dunedin Community Accounting, which provides advice and training to community groups.

Whiting retired in May 2023. She died from pancreatic cancer in Dunedin on 22 July 2024, survived by her husband and three children.

== Honours and awards ==
Whiting was elected a Fellow of the Chartered Accountants Australia and New Zealand in 2018, for her "outstanding contribution and achievement to the profession of accountancy".

In 2014 Whiting was awarded a University of Otago Teaching Excellence Award, and in 2018 the Otago Business School Citizenship Award.

== Selected works ==
- Martin Clarke; Dyna Seng; Whiting, Rosalind Heather (2011). "Intellectual capital and firm performance in Australia". Journal of Intellectual Capital. 12 (4): 505–530. doi:10.1108/14691931111181706. Wikidata Q130455461.
- Daniel C.M. Low; Helen Roberts; Whiting, Rosalind Heather (2015). "Board gender diversity and firm performance: Empirical evidence from Hong Kong, South Korea, Malaysia and Singapore". Pacific-Basin Finance Journal. 35: 381–401. doi:10.1016/j.pacfin.2015.02.008. Wikidata Q130455462.
- Whiting, Rosalind Heather; James C. Miller (2008). "Voluntary disclosure of intellectual capital in New Zealand annual reports and the "hidden value"". Journal of Human Resource Costing and Accounting. 12 (1): 26–50. doi:10.1108/14013380810872725. Wikidata Q130456049.
- Whiting, Rosalind Heather; James Woodcock (2011). "Firm characteristics and intellectual capital disclosure by Australian companies". Journal of Human Resource Costing and Accounting. 15 (2): 102–126. doi:10.1108/14013381111157337. Wikidata Q130456042.
- Clare T. Gardner; Markus J. Milne; Carolyn P. Stringer; Whiting, Rosalind Heather (2005). "Oral and written communication apprehension in accounting students: Curriculum impacts and impacts on academic performance". Accounting Education. 14 (3): 313–336. doi:10.1080/06939280500077269. Wikidata Q130456043.
- Whiting, Rosalind Heather; CHRISTINE WRIGHT (2001). "EXPLAINING GENDER INEQUITY IN THE NEW ZEALAND ACCOUNTING PROFESSION". British Accounting Review. 33 (2): 191–222. doi:10.1006/bare.2001.0161. Wikidata Q130456048.
