= International Federation of Francophone Accountants =

- Abbreviation: FIDEF
- Formation: 1981
- Purpose: Education and licensing of professional accountants
- Headquarters: Paris, France
- Region served: Francophone countries
- Official language: French
- Website: www.fidef.org

The International Federation of Francophone Accountants (Federation Internationale des Experts-Comptables Francophone, or FIDEF) is an organization that promotes exchange and cooperation between accountants in the French-speaking community. Currently, the association has brought together 52 Member Institutes from 37 countries, representing 100,000 accounting professionals.

== Members ==
| Albania | Institute of Authorized Chartered Auditors of Albania (IEKA) |
| Algeria | (Associate) |
| Belgium | Institut des Reviseurs d'Entreprise (IRE); Institut des Experts-Comptables et des Conseils Fiscaux (IEC) |
| Benin | Ordre des Experts-Comptables et Comptables agréés de Bénin (OECCA - Bénin) |
| Bulgaria | Institut des Experts Comptables Diplomes (ICPA) |
| Burkina Faso | Ordre National des Experts Comptables du Burkina Faso (ONECCA-BF) |
| Burundi | Ordre des Professionnels Comptables (OPC) |
| Cambodia | Kampuchea Institute of Certified Public Accountants and Auditors (KICPAA) |
| Cameroon | Ordre National des Experts Comptables du Cameroun (ONECCA) |
| Canada | Certified General Accountants Association of Canada (ICCA-Canada) |
| Central African Republic | Ordre National des Experts-Comptables Centrafricains |
| Congo Brazzaville | Association des Professionnels de la Comptabilite (APC) |
| Congo Democratic Republic | Institut des Reviseurs Comptables (IRC-RDC); Conseil Permanent de la Comptabilite (associate) |
| Côte d'Ivoire | Ordre des Experts Comptables et des Comptables Agrees de Cote D'Ivoire (OECCA-CI) |
| France | Conseil Superieur de L'Ordre des Experts Comptables (CSOEC); Compagnie Nationale des Commissaires aux Comptes (CNCC); Institut National des Techniques Economiques et Comptables (INTEC) (associate); Association Francophone de Comptabilite (AFC) (associate) |
| Gabon | Association Pour le Developpement des Etudes Comptables (ADEC) (associate) |
| Guinea | Ordre des Experts Comptables de Guinee (OECA) |
| Haiti | Ordre des comptables professionnels agréés d'Haïti (OCPAH) |
| Laos | Institut des Comptables et des Auditeurs du Laos |
| Lebanon | Lebanese Association of Certified Public Accountants (LACPA); Organisation Arabe des Experts Comptables (AOCPA) (associate) |
| Madagascar | Ordre des Experts Comptables et Financiers de Madagascar (OECFM); Conseil Superieur de la Comptabilite (associate) |
| Mali | Ordre des Comptables Agrees et Experts Comptables Agrees du Mali (OCAECA) |
| Mauritania | Ordre National des Experts Comptables Mauritanien (ONEC - RIM) (associate) |
| Moldova | Association des Comptables et Auditeurs Professionnels de la République de Moldavie |
| Monaco | Ordre des Experts-Comptables de la Principaute de Monaco |
| Morocco | Ordre des Experts Comptables du Maroc |
| Niger | Ordre des Experts et des Comptables Agrees du Niger |
| Poland | Krajowa Izba Bieglych Rewidentów (KIBR) |
| Romania | Corps des Experts Comptables et Comptables Agrees de Roumanie (CECCAR); Chambre des Auditeurs Financiers du Roumanie (CAFR) |
| Senegal | Ordre National des Experts Comptables et Comptables Agrees du Senegal (ONECCA) |
| Togo | Ordre National des Experts Comptables et des Comptables Agrees du Togo |
| Tunisia | Ordre des Experts Comptables de Tunisie (OECT); Institut Tunisien des Experts Comptables (ITEC) (associate); Compagnie des Comptables de Tunisie (CCT) (associate) |
| Ukraine | Ukrainian Federation of Professional Accountants and Auditors |

== See also ==
- IFAC Member Bodies and Associates
