= CPA Canada =

National organization representing the Canadian accounting profession

Chartered Professional Accountants of Canada
- Logo of CPA Canada
- Abbreviation: CPA Canada
- Predecessor: Canadian Institute of Chartered Accountants; Certified General Accountants Association of Canada; Certified Management Accountants of Canada
- Formation: January 1, 2013
- Legal status: Canada Not-for-profit Corporations Act
- Headquarters: Toronto, Canada
- Coordinates: 43°38′40.4″N 79°23′28.86″W
- Region served: Canada, Bermuda
- Members: 220,000+ (March 2022)
- Official language: English, French
- President & CEO: Pamela Steer
- Board Chair: Richard Olfert
- Revenue: ▲CAD $130.2 million (2023)
- Expenses: ▲CAD $133.5 million (2023)
- Volunteers: 7300+ (2023)
- Students: 27,726 (2023)
- Website: https://www.cpacanada.ca/en

Chartered Professional Accountants of Canada (CPA Canada; French: Comptables professionnels agréés du Canada) is the national organization representing the Canadian accounting profession through the unification of the three largest accounting organizations: the Canadian Institute of Chartered Accountants (CICA), the Society of Management Accountants of Canada (CMA Canada) and Certified General Accountants of Canada (CGA-Canada), as well as the 40 national and provincial accounting bodies. It is one of the largest organizations of its type in the world, with over 217,000 Chartered Professional Accountants in Canada and around the world.

CPA Canada conducts research on business issues, supports the setting of accounting, auditing and assurance standards for business, non-profits and government, issues guidance and leadership connected to accounting, auditing, assurance and financial literacy, and generally supports the profession of accounting in Canada.

== History ==
Historically, Canada had three nationally recognized accounting classifications until 2013: Chartered Accountant (CA), Certified Management Accountant (CMA), and Certified General Accountant (CGA). The national CA and CGA designations were created by Acts of Parliament in 1902 (CA) and 1913 (CGA). The Canada Corporations Act of 1920 established the CMA designation.

In January 2012, after eight months of discussions between members and stakeholders, the Canadian Institute of Chartered Accountants (CICA), the Society of Management Accountants of Canada (CMA Canada) and Certified General Accountants of Canada (CGA-Canada) published A Framework for Uniting the Canadian Accounting Profession. The document proposed the unification of the separate organizations into one new designation: Canadian Chartered Professional Accountant-CPA.

One year later, on January 1, 2013, under the Canada Not-For-Profit Corporation Act, Chartered Professional Accountants of Canada (CPA Canada) was established by CICA and CMA Canada.The Act supported provincial accounting bodies that were coming together under the CPA designation. On October 1, 2014 CGA-Canada joined CPA-Canada, finishing the process of bringing all of Canada's professional accounting organizations together under the auspices of one nationally recognized organization. Today all recognized provincial and national Canadian accounting organizations are unified under the CPA designation. There are over 217,000 members in Canada and internationally who hold the Canadian CPA designation.

== CPA Competency Map ==
The CPA Competency Map lays the foundation for the CPA certification program, including education, accreditation, examinations, and practical experience requirements, and describes the knowledge, skills and proficiency levels you must achieve to become a Canadian CPA.

=== Technical Competencies ===
1. Financial Reporting
2. Strategy & Governance
3. Management Accounting
4. Audit & Assurance
5. Corporate Finance
6. Taxation

=== Enabling Competencies ===
1. Acting Ethically and Demonstrating Professional Values
2. Leading
3. Collaborating
4. Managing Self
5. Adding Value
6. Solving Problems and Making Decisions
7. Communication

== Economic and social development ==
One of CPA Canada's mandates is to improve the financial literacy of the citizens of Canada through providing education done through the organization's Financial Literacy Program.

CPA Canada and AFOA Canada signed a Memorandum of Understanding in February 2016 which included a provision for CPA Canada to integrate some course material from its ACAF program into the program which trains Certified Aboriginal Financial Managers, (CAFM). This proposal allows CAFM students to obtain an ACAF more quickly. In 2008 the Martin Family Initiative (first knows as the Martin Aboriginal Education Initiative (MAEI) asked CPA Canada to create a mentoring program which would enhance the chances for educational changes for indigenous youth. The program expanded in 2015 to include the McCarthy Tetrault law firm and the Accounting and Legal Mentorship Program (ALMP) found in 29 schools. The program has succeeded in increasing graduation rates, motivated students to stay in school beyond the secondary level, and helped them find jobs, especially in the legal and accounting industries.

== Public policy and government ==
The organization helps develop public policy through its involvement in the process. CPA Canada contributes its expertise on many issues relating to tax and fiscal policy, financial literacy, skills development, climate adaptation, immigration, trade, ethics, good governance and accountability. They are also called on to opine on budget prioritization, tax reform and responsible budgeting. Goals include the strengthening of financial literacy and supporting infrastructure projects that stimulate productivity.

== Thought leadership ==
The organization offers guidance on accounting and business issues to its members and others through its publications, webinars, videos, blogs and other types of media. Among the subjects addressed are sustainability, tax, management and the future of financial reporting.

== Education ==
Before CPA candidates can acquire certification they must complete a certification program which is developed by CPA Canada. The program is made up of education, a period of time in which candidates must meet relevant experience requirements, and at the end of the process they must take and pass the Common Final Examination. The program meets or surpasses all International Federation of Accountants (IFAC) standards for practical experience and education plus it meets the requirements of the main international accounting certification bodies.

=== Exemptions ===
CPA Canada recognizes many post-secondary institutions (PSIs) and accredit them to deliver part or all of its educations requirements from preparatory courses and Professional Education Program (PEP) at the undergrad and graduate levels. These accredited programs feature accredited courses that result in either a graduate diploma or master's degree. The University of Waterloo School of Accounting and Finance, York University's Schulich School of Business and Brock University's Goodman School of Business offer the Master of Accounting program, waiving all the modules and education requirements up until the Common Final Examination.

In addition, the following organizations offer recognition and exemptions for candidates/members of CPA Canada:

- CIMA: Canadian CPAs are granted the CIMA membership upon passing the CIMA Strategic Case Study Exam and by having more than two years of post-designation experience. CIMA membership grants the ability to use the CGMA designation.
- Institute of Internal Auditors: As a CPA from CPA Canada, the Certified Internal Auditor (CIA) designation can be earned after passing the CIA Challenge Exam, instead of having to write the 3-part CIA exams.
- CBV Institute:
  - CPA candidates who chose "Finance" in the Professional Education Program (PEP) as an elective are exempt from the CBV Level I exam.
  - Individuals who complete the two-part Valuation for Financial Reporting (VFR) certificate that is jointly offered by CPA Canada and CBV Institute will receive an exemption from CBV Institute’s Valuation for Financial Reporting elective course.

== President and CEO ==
Joy Thomas, FCPA, FCMA became president and CEO of CPA Canada on April 1, 2016. Thomas had held the position of executive vice president until then. She was a participant in the process that united Canada's accounting profession under one designation. Thomas was appointed to the National Steering Committee on Financial Literacy in February 2017. She is a board director and a member of the governance committee of the International Federation of Accountants. Thomas was also on the board and Chair of the Audit Committee of the Financial Planning Standards Board Ltd.

After 4 years of service at CPA Canada, Joy Thomas stepped down as President and CEO. The role is succeeded by Charles-Antoine St-Jean, FCPA, FCA, as President and CEO, effective July 20, 2020. Charles-Antoine St-Jean's term officially ended on March 31, 2022. Pamela Steer became the new CEO effective April 19, 2022.

== International representation ==
CPA Canada fulfills one of its mandates to represent Canadian accountants internationally through its membership in the following organizations:

- A4S Accounting Bodies Network
- A4S CFO Leadership Network
- AICPA/CPA Canada Cross-border Tax Committee
- Association of Chartered Accountants in the United States
- Confederation of Asian and Pacific Accountants (CAPA)
- Fédération Internationale Des Experts comptables et commissaires aux comptes Francophones (FIDEF)
- Global Accounting Alliance
- International Corporate Governance Network
- International Federation of Accountants
- International Innovation Network
- International Integrated Reporting Council
- OECD Business and Industry Advisory Committee (with the Canadian Chamber of Commerce)

== International mutual agreements ==
CPA Canada has agreements in place which allow Canadian CPA's to obtain membership or working rights of numerous international accounting bodies listed below, often without any examinations.

- AICPA and the National Association of State Boards of Accountancy
- Chartered Accountants Australia and New Zealand
- Hong Kong Institute of Certified Public Accountants
- Institute of Chartered Accountants in England and Wales
- The Institute of Chartered Accountants of India
- Chartered Accountants Ireland
- Instituto Mexicano de Contadores Publicos (CPC designation)
- Ordre des Experts-Comptables de France (Quebec only)
- Institute of Chartered Accountants of Pakistan
- Institute of Chartered Accountants of Scotland
- South African Institute of Chartered Accountants
- Institute of Chartered Accountants of Zimbabwe

== See also ==
- Common Final Examination
- International Federation of Accountants
- American Institute of Certified Public Accountants
- List of international professional associations
