= Hong Kong Accounting Standards =

Accounting principles and rules

The Hong Kong Accounting Standards (HKAS), formerly HKSSAP, is a set of accounting standards issued by the Hong Kong Institute of Certified Public Accountants.

== Details ==
- HKAS 1 Presentation of Financial statements
- HKAS 2 Inventories
- HKAS 7 Cash flow statements
- HKAS 8 Accounting Policies, Changes in Accounting Estimates
- HKAS 10 Events after the Reporting Period
- HKAS 11 Construction contracts
- HKAS 12 Income taxes
- HKAS 14 Segment reporting
- HKAS 16 Property, Plant and Equipment
- HKAS 17 Leases
- HKAS 18 Revenue
- HKAS 19 Employee benefits
- HKAS 20 Accounting for government grants and disclosure of government assistance
- HKAS 21 The Effects of Changes in Foreign exchange rates
- HKAS 23 Borrowing Costs
- HKAS 24 Related Party Disclosures
- HKAS 26 Accounting and Reporting by Retirement Benefit Plans
- HKAS 27 Consolidated and Separate Financial Statements
- HKAS 28 Investments in Associates
- HKAS 29 Financial Reporting in Hyperinflationary Economies
- HKAS 30 Disclosures in the Financial Statements of Banks and Similar Financial Institutions
- HKAS 31 Investments in Joint Ventures
- HKAS 32 Financial instruments: Disclosure and Presentation
- HKAS 33 Earnings per share
- HKAS 34 Interim Financial Reporting
- HKAS 36 Impairment of Assets
- HKAS 37 Provisions, contingent liabilities and contingent assets
- HKAS 38 Intangible assets
- HKAS 39 Financial Instruments: Recognition and Measurement
- HKAS 40 Investment Property
- HKAS 41 Agriculture

== See also ==
- International Financial Reporting Standards
