= Japanese Institute of Certified Public Accountants =

Japanese organization for Certified Public Accountants

- 日本公認会計士協会
- Abbreviation: JICPA
- Headquarters: Tokyo, Japan
- Region served: Japan
- Members: > 20,000
- Chairman and President: Shozo Yamazaki
- Website: www.hp.jicpa.or.jp

The Japanese Institute of Certified Public Accountants (JICPA) is the sole organization for Certified Public Accountants (CPA) in Japan. It was originally formed in 1949 as a self-regulatory association, and reorganized under the Certified Public Accountants Act in 1966. To practice as a CPA, a person must register with the JICPA and join its membership. The JICPA, through its various committees and project teams, carries out a wide range of activities from self-regulation to the provision of services to its members.
