= Ordre des Experts-Comptables =

Professional order

- Abbreviation: OEC
- Formation: September 19, 1945; 80 years ago
- Legal status: Body corporate created under an ordinance of the Government of France
- Headquarters: Paris, France
- Region served: France
- Official language: French
- President: Agnes Bricard
- Website: www.experts-comptables.fr
- Formerly called: L'Ordre des Experts-Comptables et des Comptables Agréés

The Ordre des Experts-Comptables (Institute of Chartered Accountants), or OEC, is a professional organization of Chartered Accountants in France. The institute was created by Ordinance in 1945 and placed under the Ministry of Economy, Finance and Budget. It represents Chartered Accountants, supports them in their professional development and guarantees their ethical conduct.

The institute is represented by the Supreme Council (Conseil Superieur de L'Ordre des Experts Comptables) based in Paris. The Supreme Council consists of 44 elected members and the presidents of 22 regional councils.

The OEC is a member of the International Federation of Accountants (IFAC) and of the International Federation of Francophone Accountants (FIDEF). CGA-Canada has a Mutual Recognition Agreement with the OEC. There is a straightforward process for a member of the one institution to become a member of the other, subject to passing an examination. There are two trade associations for accountants in France: the Institut Français des Experts-Comptables and Experts-Comptables de France. These are not associated with the OEC.

== See also ==
- International Federation of Francophone Accountants
