= Certified General Accountant =

Certified General Accountant (CGA) is a professional designation granted to Canadian accountants. A person who meets the education, experience and examination requirements of the Certified General Accountants of Canada (CGA-Canada) is entitled to use the professional designation and add the letters "CGA" to their title. A CGA is jointly a member of CGA-Canada and a provincial or territorial CGA association, or a CGA association overseas.

CGAs work throughout the world in industry, commerce, finance, government, public practice and the not-for-profit sector. CGA-Canada is working with the Chartered Professional Accountants of Canada (CPA Canada) to integrate operations under the CPA banner in 2014. Those with a CGA designation will be automatically granted the Chartered Professional Accountant (CPA) designation and are required to use both concurrently until 2024, (noted as CPA, CGA) and then adjust to the CPA designation alone just for it.

== History ==
The national association, first known as the Canadian Accountants' Association, was founded in 1908 by a trio of Canadian Pacific Railway accountants in Montreal, Quebec. Five years later, in 1913, the General Accountants' Association, as it was then known, was granted a charter from the government of Canada. By the mid-1940s, association chapters were established from coast-to-coast. Provincial, territorial and regional (offshore) chapters were later established under their own charters.

Auditing rights are regulated by provincial governments. In Prince Edward Island, only qualified CAs and CGAs can perform public accounting and auditing in accordance with the Public Accounting and Auditing Act. In all other provinces, except Quebec and Ontario (detailed below), only qualified CAs, CGAs, and CMAs (Certified Management Accountants) may audit public companies.

Historically, Quebec and Ontario only allowed CAs to audit public companies. In 2004, the Ontario government passed legislation that would enable CAs, CGAs and CMAs to practice public accounting under a reconstituted Public Accountants Council, and as of June 2010 Ontario CGAs were allowed to issue audit opinions.

In August 2005, a panel was constituted under the Agreement on Internal Trade (AIT) to rule on a challenge filed by CGA New Brunswick and CGA-Canada. It found Quebec's measures denying CGAs the right to practice public accounting in Quebec to impair trade and recommended legislative changes. The Quebec government committed to address the problem. By November 2009, the 'Regulation respecting the public accountancy permit of the Ordre des comptables généraux accrédités du Québec' enabled qualified CGAs to offer the full range of public accounting services to for-profit and publicly listed companies.

On November 6, 2009, Ontario issued a Notice of Measure claiming that material differences exist in respect of the practice of public accounting in Canada and to protect consumers out of province public accountants would be assessed against Ontario's requirements. Manitoba supported by Alberta, British Columbia and Saskatchewan objected on the grounds that the Ontario regime causes injury to CGAs and impairs internal trade. A Panel convened under the Agreement on Internal Trade reviewed submissions and held a public hearing in Toronto on November 29, 2011. The Panel found that Ontario's notice of measure has impaired or would impair internal trade and has caused or would cause injury. The Panel recommended that Ontario comply with its AIT obligations by April 15, 2012. The outcome is important for CGAs because it removes the last barrier to mobility allowing CGAs to practice public accounting anywhere in Canada.

In October 2013, a Special General Meeting of members was held to ratify an Integration Agreement between CGA-Canada and CPA Canada, which was previously approved by the CGA-Canada Board of Directors. The Integration Agreement has now been approved for adoption, it is now CGA-Canada's intent to sign the Agreement with CPA Canada and continue to work towards unification of the entire profession in Canada.

== Education ==
CGA-Canada's professional education program is competency-based. Competency-based education requires candidates to perform tasks and roles to standards expected in the workplace.

The knowledge, skills and professional values required of a CGA are reflected in a list of competencies. These competencies extend over three areas: professionalism, leadership and professional knowledge. They are validated periodically through extensive survey analysis. The CGA Competency Framework details the 130 competencies required of a newly certified CGA.

The complete academic program consists of 19 courses, two business cases, and professional qualification exams, spread over several levels: Levels 1 to 3 (Foundation Studies), Level 4 (Advanced Studies), and final level, the PACE qualification or certification level.

A CGA must have an undergraduate degree. Students normally require 36 months of supervised work experience, but in all cases, they require a minimum of 24 months. They may meet the experience requirements in any business sector and in a variety of fields.

Before issuing audit opinions a CGA must first be licensed as a public accountant. The requirements for licensing include at least 500 public accounting hours per year.

== See also ==
- Certified General Accountants Association of Canada

== CGA association websites ==
- CGA Alberta
- CGA-Bermuda
- CGA British Columbia
- CGA-Canada
- CGA Caribbean
- CGA-China
- CGA-Hong Kong
- CGA Manitoba
- CGA New Brunswick
- CGA Newfoundland & Labrador
- CGA NWT/Nunavut
- CGA Nova Scotia
- CGA Ontario
- CGA-PEI
- CGA Quebec
- CGA Saskatchewan
- CGA Online
- CGA Canada
