= Common Final Examination =

The Common Final Examination (CFE) is the final examination of the Chartered Professional Accountant (CPA) professional designation in Canada. The 3-day CFE is the culmination of the rigorous two-year graduate-level CPA program. The exam not only includes important accounting disciplines like finance, governance, strategy, and assurance, but also evaluates professional skills such as critical analysis, decision-making, and professional judgment. Previously known as the Uniform Evaluation (UFE), the UFE has been discontinued following the unification of the three accounting designations (CA, CMA, CGA) in Canada and Bermuda in June 2015.

Administered nationally by CPA Canada, and conducted regionally by the provincial/regional orders, the CFE is written over the course of three sequential days and is the culmination of years of study in financial accounting, management accounting, corporate finance, performance management, taxation, assurance and other business-related university courses. Writing the CFE requires successful completion of preliminary education requirements including CPA preparatory courses and CPA Canada's Professional Education Program (PEP). Upon passing the CFE and completing 30 months of approved practical experience, the candidate is designated a Chartered Professional Accountant and may use the CPA post-nominal letters.

The Common Final Examination is typically offered twice a year in May (Spring) and September (Fall). During the COVID-19 pandemic, the May 2020 exam was cancelled along with many other CPA modules. The CFE resumed beginning with the September 2020 exam. The upcoming CFEs are scheduled between:

- May 28 to May 30, 2024
- September 10 to September 12, 2024

== CPA Competency Map ==
=== Technical Competencies ===
1. Financial Reporting
2. Management Accounting
3. Strategy & Governance
4. Audit & Assurance
5. Corporate Finance
6. Taxation

=== Enabling Competencies ===
1. Acting Ethically and Demonstrating Professional Values
2. Leading
3. Collaborating
4. Managing Self
5. Adding Value
6. Solving Problems and Making Decisions
7. Communicating

== Exam Structure ==
Students must demonstrate the depth and breadth of their abilities according to the CPA Competency Map. Students answer questions which are presented in the form of business cases that include a combination of both explicit and implicit requirements for each case's "users", followed by a list of exhibits that provide case facts from which observations, suggestions and conclusions are derived. Common scenarios include providing advice on how to conduct an audit, advising a client on the pros and cons of investing funds in a given business venture, and providing support to an organization as an internal accountant or auditor.

The three-day exam consisted of case based simulations:

- Day 1: candidates will have four hours to write a case in relation to the Capstone 1 group project. Candidates will be assessed on enabling competencies such as communications skills and professionalism, as well as some technical competencies.
- Day 2: students would choose an elective "depth" area from four competency areas - performance management, finance, assurance or taxation. Day 2 will last five hours in length and students must be rated "competent" in the chosen elective area as well as either financial reporting or management accounting. Note that students wishing to pursue a public accounting licence must have passed the assurance and taxation courses from their prior PEP modules and show depth in both financial reporting and assurance on the CFE.
- Day 3: multiple (usually three) multi-competency cases are provided within a time frame of four hours aimed to evaluate the student's "breadth" in the competency map. A minimum "Reaching Competent (RC)" grade must be achieved for every individual competency (all six areas).

=== Evaluation Criteria ===
All CPA cases are evaluated based on "competency ratings". They are:

- Not Addressed (NA): candidate has not addressed the assessment opportunity.
- Nominal Competence (NC): candidate has addressed the assessment opportunity, but the analysis is incorrect or not related to the issue.
- Reaching Competence (RC): RCs and Cs are both counted towards "breadth" test for day 3. RC candidates demonstrate more proficiency and understanding than NC, but not at the Competent level.
- Competence (C): the amount of Cs are used for the "depth" test on day 2. Competent candidates demonstrate the required competency levels as expected by a CPA.
- Competence with Distinction (CD): Candidates are not expected to achieve this high level of competency. CDs are essentially Cs in terms of exam grading.

== Pass Rates ==
National pass rates for the former UFE between 2003 and 2008 have been 65.5%, 74.5%, 74.0%, 79.3%, 74.6%, and 71.7% respectively. Beginning with the September 2009 UFE, the Board of Evaluators no longer released statistics on pass rates.

The CFE Board of Evaluators began releasing statistics on pass rates along with Board Reports on candidate performance. The following are the first attempts of CFE Pass Rates:

- 2024 May and September CFE 67.3% (combined average)
- 2023 May and September CFE 70.5% (combined average)
- 2022 May and September CFE 71.3% (combined average)
- 2021 May and September CFE 73.6% (combined average)
- 2020 September CFE 75.8%
- 2019 September CFE 76.5%
- 2018 September CFE 77.6%
- 2017 September CFE 77.6%
- 2016 September CFE 76.8%
- 2016 May CFE 68.7%
- 2015 September CFE 82.9%

== CFE Honour Roll & Gold Medal ==
Every CFE, the Board of Examiners releases the Honour Roll recipients along with the CFE results. The CFE honour roll members are recognized for their performance in the exam that demonstrated academic excellence and exceptional abilities. The Honour Roll recipients are determined as the top 1% of the first-time writers that wrote all three days of the CFE. Among the honour roll members, the prestigious Governor General's gold medal is awarded for the candidate with the highest standing in Canada for a cash prize of $5,000, along with 3 provincial gold medalists (top performers in their respective CPA provincial body) each awarded $2,500.

== Successful Candidates ==
September 2023:

- Alberta
- British Columbia & Yukon
- Manitoba
- New Brunswick
- Newfoundland & Labrador
- Northwest Territories & Nunavut
- Nova Scotia
- Ontario
- Prince Edward Island
- Quebec
- Saskatchewan

May 2023:

- Alberta
- British Columbia & Yukon
- Manitoba
- New Brunswick
- Newfoundland & Labrador
- Northwest Territories & Nunavut
- Nova Scotia
- Ontario
- Prince Edward Island: Not Disclosed.
- Quebec
- Saskatchewan

=== CFE Reports ===
Following every CFE, CPA Canada publishes the CFE Board of Examiners’ report, which provides feedback on candidates’ performance and commentary from the Board of Examiners.

- CFE Report
