= Hong Kong Institute of Certified Public Accountants =

Professional accounting body of Hong Kong

- 香港會計師公會
- Logo of HKICPA
- Abbreviation: HKICPA
- Predecessor: Hong Kong Society of Accountants
- Formation: 1 January 1973; 53 years ago
- Legal status: Statutory body corporate established under Professional Accountants Ordinance
- Headquarters: Wanchai, Hong Kong
- Members: >47,000 (2021)
- President: Fong Wan Huen, Loretta
- Vice President: Roy Leung
- Vice President: Au Chun Hing, Edward
- Chief Executive and Registrar: Margaret W.S. Chan
- Students: >17,000 (2021)
- Website: hkicpa.org.hk

Hong Kong Institute of Certified Public Accountants
- Traditional Chinese: 香港會計師公會
- Simplified Chinese: 香港会计师公会
Transcriptions
Standard Mandarin
- Hanyu Pinyin: Xiānggǎng Kuàijìshī Gōnghuì
Yue: Cantonese
- Jyutping: hoeng1 gong2 wui6 gai3 si1 gung1 wui6*2

The Hong Kong Institute of Certified Public Accountants (HKICPA, Chinese: 香港會計師公會) is the professional accounting body of Hong Kong. It is overseen by the Accounting and Financial Reporting Council.

== Responsibilities ==
- Registering accountants and issuing practising certificates.
- Regulating the professional conduct and standards of members.
- Setting codes of ethics and standards of accounting and auditing.
- Regulating the quality of entry to the profession through its qualification programme and related courses.
- Providing continuing education and other services to members.
- Promoting the accountancy profession both in Hong Kong and overseas.

== Recognition with other institutions ==
=== Association of Chartered Certified Accountants (ACCA) ===
Prior to 2002, Hong Kong accountants were allowed to obtain full memberships from both Association of Chartered Certified Accountants (ACCA) and HKICPA under a joint examination scheme between the two institutions. A mutual recognition agreement was then announced between the two institutions; this has been renewed from 2010 until 2015.

=== Institutes of Chartered Accountants ===
HKICPA has Mutual Recognition Agreements with the major Chartered Accountant bodies worldwide:

- American Institute of Certified Public Accountants since October 2011
- Institute of Chartered Accountants in England and Wales
- Institute of Chartered Accountants of Scotland
- Institute of Chartered Accountants in Ireland
- Institute of Chartered Accountants of Australia
- Chartered Professional Accountants Canada
- New Zealand Institute of Chartered Accountants
- South African Institute of Chartered Accountants
- Institute of Chartered Accountants of Zimbabwe

These agreements, in general, only apply to relatively recent HKICPA members who qualified through the Qualification Programme.

=== Other overseas bodies or British qualified accountants ===
HKICPA also has recognition arrangements in place with:

- Association of International Accountants
- Chartered Institute of Management Accountants
- CPA Australia

== Status ==
Incorporated by the Professional Accountants Ordinance (Chapter 50 of the Laws of Hong Kong) on 1 January 1973, the Hong Kong Institute of Certified Public Accountants (the institute) is the only statutory licensing body of accountants in Hong Kong responsible for regulation of the accountancy profession. There is an associate organisation called the HKAAT.

== International links ==
The institute is a member body of the following international or regional organisations:

- Asia Oceania Tax Consultants' Association
- Confederation of Asian and Pacific Accountants
- Global Accounting Alliance
- International Accounting Standards Board
- International Federation of Accountants
- International Federation of Insolvency Practitioners

== See also ==
- Hong Kong Accounting Standards
