= Certified Management Accountant =

Professional credential

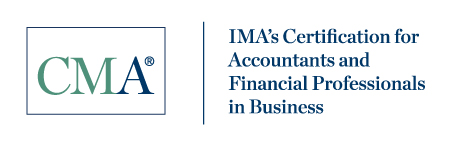
Logo

Certified Management Accountant (CMA) is a professional certification credential in the management accounting and financial management fields. The certification signifies that the person possesses knowledge in the areas of financial planning, analysis, control, decision support, and professional ethics. There are many professional bodies globally that have management accounting professional qualifications. The main bodies that offer the CMA certification are the Institute of Management Accountants (USA) and the Institute of Certified Management Accountants (Australia).

Since Certified Management Accountants of Canada merged with CPA Canada in September 2015, only the IMA and ICMA offer CMA certification. However, the certification pathways for the two bodies, in terms of entry requirements, study syllabi and experience requirements, are very different.

The United States–based Institute of Management Accountants USA is one of the two global bodies that offers CMA certification. Candidates may prepare for the exams using self-study materials from IMA-approved publishers, such as Becker , Gleim , and HOCK International CMA. IMA also has a list of approved CMA course providers, each of these providers meets strict criteria to be recognized as such .

USA-certified professionals work inside organizations of all sizes, industries, and types, including manufacturing and services, public and private enterprises, not-for-profit organizations, academic institutions, Government entities (USA), and multinational corporations worldwide. To obtain certification, candidates must pass a rigorous exam, meet an educational requirement, experience requirement, and demonstrate a commitment to continuous learning through continuing professional education (CPE).

== The Certified Management Accountant (USA) exam ==
Prior to 2010, the CMA exam was organized into four parts: Business Analysis, Management Accounting and Reporting, Strategic Management and Decision Analysis. Since 2010, the exam has been condensed into two four-hour parts, covering largely the same material as the former four part exam with added emphasis on financial planning, analysis, control, and decision support.

Each exam consists of descriptive questions and two 30-minute essay questions. Candidates are given 3 hours to complete the multiple choice section and one hour to complete the essays. Candidates must show their work for the essay questions in order to receive credit. Parts 1 and 2 of the CMA exam are scored on a scale of 0–500 with a candidate's raw score converted to a uniform scaled score against all exam candidates. On this scale, a score of 360 represents the minimum passing scaled score.

=== Exam Content ===
Part 1 – Financial Planning, Performance, and Analytics.

- External financial reporting decisions (15%)
- Planning, budgeting and forecasting (20%)
- Performance management (20%)
- Cost management (15%)
- Internal controls (15%)
- Technology and Analytics (15%)

Part 2 – Strategic Financial Management

- Financial statement analysis (20%)
- Corporate finance (20%)
- Decision analysis (25%)
- Risk management (10%)
- Investment decisions (10%)
- Professional ethics (15%)

=== Additional certification requirements ===
In addition to successfully passing the exams, CMA candidates must fulfill education and experience requirements in order to be certified:

1. Bachelor's degree from an accredited college or university

2. Two continuous years of professional experience employing the principles of management accounting and financial management including:

- Preparation of financial statements
- Financial planning & analysis
- Monthly, quarterly, and year end close
- Auditing (external or internal)
- Budget preparation & reporting
- Manage general ledger and balance sheets
- Forecasting
- Company investment decision making
- Costing analysis
- Risk evaluation

3. For certified CMAs, 30 hours of CPE credits, including two hours of ethics, and annual IMA Membership are required to maintain active status. In September 2021, IMA announced the historic milestone of having awarded 100,000 CMA certifications.

== The Certified Management Accountant (Australia) exam ==
The Institute of Certified Management Accountants (ICMA) is an Australian organisation operating globally, focused on management accounting. A management accountant applies his or her professional knowledge and skill in the preparation and presentation of financial and other decision-oriented information in such a way as to assist management in the formulation of policies and in the planning and control of the operation of the undertaking.

Management Accountants therefore are seen as the "value-creators" amongst the accountants. They are much more interested in forward looking and taking decisions that will affect the future of the organization, than in the historical recording and compliance (scorekeeping) aspects of the profession. Management accounting knowledge and experience can therefore be obtained from varied fields and functions within an organization, such as information management, treasury, efficiency auditing, marketing, valuation, pricing, logistics, etc.

=== Education program ===
The Institute of Certified Management Accountants is committed to scholarship and quality education at the lowest possible cost to its students. The educational objectives of ICMA are therefore to further the development of management accounting education in the universities and business schools of Australia and internationally, to encourage research into the application of management accounting theory and practice, and to provide continuing professional development for its members.

In order to achieve the above objectives, the following educational programmes have been implemented by the institute.

==== Technician-level programmes ====
These programmes cover the three technician-level qualifications of ICMA:

- Certified Accounting Technician (CAT)
- Registered Cost Accountant (RCA)
- Registered Business Accountant (RBA)

There are four stages of the technician-level programmes, consisting of the following subjects:

===== Stage 1 =====
- Organizational Management
- Accounting Control Systems

===== Stage 2 =====
- Financial Economics
- International Business Law & Governance
- Business Analysis & Audit
- International Business Taxation

===== Stage 3 =====
- Financial Accounting
- Marketing Management
- Information Management
- Strategic Management

===== Stage 4 =====
- Financial Management
- Financial Statement Analysis
- Financial Modelling
- Managerial Accounting

==== Professional-level programmes ====
These programmes cover the professional-level qualifications of ICMA:

- Graduate Management Accountant (GMA)
- Associate Management Accountant (AMA)
- Certified Management Accountant (CMA)

These certifications are only open to degree holders. Those holding an accounting/finance degree (or equivalent professional qualification) are exempt from all four stages of the technician-level program and can advance directly to the CMA program. Those holding a non-accounting/finance degree or professional qualification need to undertake a Graduate Conversion program (Stage 4) prior to undertaking the CMA program.

=== Graduate Conversion Program (for non-accounting graduates/non-accounting professionals) ===
Students who have obtained a non-accounting degree, or are full members of recognized professional non-accounting bodies, such as the Chartered Institute of Marketing, would have satisfied the broad educational objectives to enrol in the Graduate Conversion programme, which is to complete Stage 4 of the GMA programme prior to undertaking the CMA program. A student completing the Graduate Conversion programme is eligible to join as a Graduate Management Accountant (GMA).

A student completing the Graduate Management Accountant (GMA) program and having 3 years or more of business experience is eligible to join as an Associate Management Accountant (AMA). Such students can enrol for the post-graduate level CMA program at any time; but must successfully complete this program and also accumulate 5-years of business experience to be eligible to join as a Certified Management Accountant (CMA).

=== CMA program (for accounting graduates/professional accountants) ===
The flagship CMA preparatory program consists of two subjects:

1. Strategic Cost Management
2. Strategic Business Analysis

The CMA program from Australia is designed as the first post-graduate level management accounting qualification in the world. There are other unique aspects to ICMA's education program. It was the first professional body in the world to embed its CMA subjects within master's degree programs in accredited universities, and to allow those universities to examine students internally.

== Entry criteria for CMA (Australia) program ==
The CMA Preparatory Program is only open to those with a university degree in accounting or finance; or an MBA, or a recognised professional qualification in accounting/finance. Those not meeting these entry criteria need to complete the Graduate Management Accountant (GMA) or GMA Conversion program first. In addition to passing the two subjects, one needs to have 5 years of business experience to qualify as a Certified Management Accountant (CMA).

== See also ==
- Chartered Institute of Management Accountants (CIMA UK) - UK, Europe, international
- Institute of Cost Accountants of India (ICMAI) - India
- Certified Management Accountants of Canada - Canada
- Certified Public Accountant - USA
- Uniform Certified Public Accountant Examination - USA
- Chartered Financial Analyst - USA
- Certified International Investment Analyst - Europe, international
- Certified European Financial Analyst - Europe
- Institute of Cost and Management Accountants of Pakistan (ICMAP) - Pakistan
- Institute of Certified Management Accountants (ICMA Australia) - Australia, Asia-Pacific, international
- Institute of Management Accountants (IMA USA) - USA, China, international
- Institute of Cost and Management Accountants of Bangladesh - Bangladesh
- Institute of Certified Management Accountants of Sri Lanka (CMASL) - Sri Lanka
