= Chartered Professional Accountant =

Canadian accounting designation

Chartered Professional Accountant (CPA; French: comptable professionnel agréé) is the professional designation which united the three Canadian accounting designations that previously existed:

- Chartered Accountant (CA),
- Certified General Accountant (CGA)
- Certified Management Accountant (CMA).

CPA Canada is the national organization that represents the profession, and the CPA designation has been in use by members of all constituent accounting bodies in the provinces, territories and Bermuda since 2014. The legislative process for implementing the new designation began in Quebec in May 2012, and was completed in the Northwest Territories and Nunavut in January 2019.

== CPA Competency Map ==
The CPA Competency Map lays the foundation for the CPA certification program, including education, accreditation, examinations, and practical experience requirements, and describes the knowledge, skills and proficiency levels you must achieve to become a Canadian CPA.

=== Technical Competencies ===
1. Financial Reporting
2. Management Accounting
3. Strategy & Governance
4. Audit & Assurance
5. Corporate Finance
6. Taxation

=== Enabling Competencies (2020) ===
1. Acting Ethically and Demonstrating Professional Values
2. Leading
3. Collaborating
4. Managing Self
5. Adding Value
6. Solving Problems and Making Decisions
7. Communicating

Former CFE Competency Map (2019):

1. Professional & Ethical Behaviour
2. Problem solving & Decision making
3. Written & Oral communications
4. Self Management
5. Leadership & Teamwork

== Background ==
=== Origin of name ===
"Chartered Professional Accountant" is borrowed from a similar but aborted Australian merger attempt in 1998. It has been registered as an EU Community trademark by the Institute of Chartered Accountants in England and Wales. However, applications to register "CPA" as such were either withdrawn or refused.

=== History ===
CMA Canada awareness campaign (2007). There was great interprofessional rivalry happening between the three organizations prior to amalgamation.

For more than 100 years, Canada has seen several accounting designations, which eventually coalesced around the titles of "chartered accountant", "certified management accountant" and "certified general accountant". In time, it became increasingly harder to distinguish between them, as candidates in all bodies had to essentially meet the same requirements for entry. The Government of Quebec undertook a review which resulted in the goal of a merger under common regulations.

Registration as a Canadian trademark was originally sought by the Ordre des comptables agréés du Québec in September 2010, but the application lapsed. It was subsequently secured by the Institute of Chartered Accountants of Ontario in August 2011.

In January 2012, A Framework for Uniting the Canadian Accounting Profession was issued by the following three organizations: the Canadian Institute of Chartered Accountants (CICA), the Society of Management Accountants of Canada (CMA Canada) and Certified General Accountants of Canada (CGA-Canada). This framework set out a proposal to unite members of the existing designations and their 40 national and provincial accounting bodies into the Chartered Professional Accountants of Canada (CPA Canada), employing a common CPA designation.

On October 1, 2014, the union of Canada's accounting profession became complete with the integration of the CGA-Canada and CPA Canada, placing all of Canada's recognized national accounting bodies under the singular CPA banner. The Canadian CPA designation has since grown to more than 210,000 members in Canada and around the world.

=== Reason for Canadian adoption ===

The move to adopt the CPA designation was the latest of a series of consolidating moves that has affected the Canadian accounting profession between 1880 and 2010, of which the last significant merger occurred between Canadian chartered accountants and certified public accountants in the 1960s. Several attempts were made to merge the CGAs and CMAs during the 1960s, as well as of all three bodies during the 1970s. A subsequent merger attempt between chartered accountants and certified management accountants occurred in 2004, being promoted by their leaders but failing to secure adequate membership support.

In 2011, all three main bodies agreed to work towards a merger that would see a new organization with 180,000 professional members and 10,000 candidates and registered students. This new accounting body would be one of the largest in the world. Proponents of the 2012 proposal to unite the profession under the CPA argued that it would strengthen the influence, relevance and contribution of the Canadian accounting profession with domestic and international stakeholders and serve the public interest through common codes of conduct, disciplinary systems and licensing regimes.

The guiding principles for the unification were expressed to be:

- Evolution to a single designation over a 10-year transition period
- Continued use of existing designations (used in combination with the CPA, e.g.:CPA, CGA)
- Retention but no expansion of rights (ie, current mutual recognition agreements would be confined to legacy members concerned)
- A uniform certification process for new members
- Introduction of post-certification specialty programmes
- Branding the CPA designation, with de-emphasis of legacy designations
- Common code of conduct, regulations and the practice of public accountancy
- Merged operations and governance

=== Timeline ===
Chartered Accountant
Certified Public Accountant (Note: In Quebec, the Licentiate in Accountancy was first granted by McGill University in 1918, which was granted statutory recognition as a professional designation in 1920. It was subsequently replaced by "Certified Public Accountant" in 1927.) (Note: In English Canada, United Accountant (UA) was a predecessor designation, granted by the United Accountants and Auditors in Canada from 1920 (successor to the Society of Independent Accountants and Auditors formed in 1918). The UA designation was held not to infringe the protected designation of CA.) (Note: In Ontario, formed mainly from accountants and auditors working in government tax offices. The designation originated as LA (Licentiate in Accountancy) during 1926–1931, changing to IPA (Incorporated Public Accountant) during 1931–1936, before becoming CPA.)
Accredited Public Accountant (Note: Known as "APA", in effect in the western provinces as early as 1950, before merging with the Certified General Accountants at various dates as late as 1998. The designation is still reserved in Alberta, Saskatchewan, Manitoba and New Brunswick.)
Certified General Accountant
Certificate of efficiency
Registered Industrial Accountant (Note: The designation was created once provincial societies began to be formed. Originally known as "Registered Industrial and Cost Accountant" or "RIA", it was simplified in some, but not all, provinces around 1967.)
Certified Management Accountant
CPA
│
1875
│
1905
│
1935
│
1965
│
1995
│
2025
Timeline of Canadian accounting profession and designations

== See also ==
- Common Final Examination
- Professional certification
- Professional certification in financial services
- Registered Professional Accountant
