= Geoffrey Teignmouth Clarkson =

Geoffrey Teignmouth Clarkson FCA
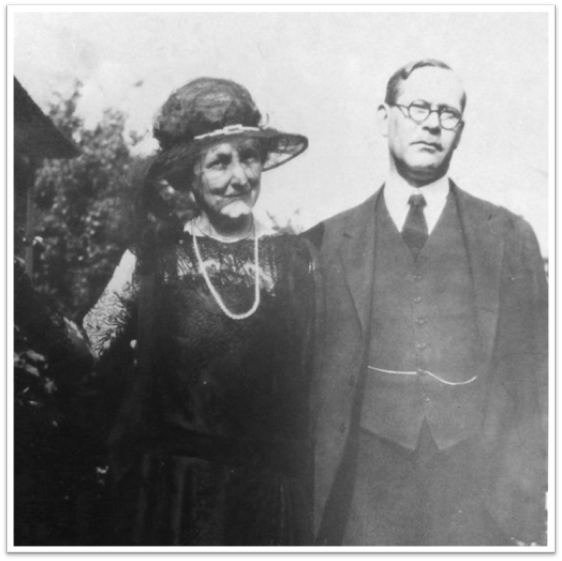
- Clarkson and his wife Edith Perry, c.1937
- Born: October 23, 1878
- Died: June 22, 1949 (aged 70)
- Citizenship: Canadian
- Occupations: Accountant, Auditor, Corporate Rescuer
- Known for: Managing Partner of Clarkson Gordon & Co, and specialist in banking audits and corporate rescues
- Spouse: Edith Perry (m. 1901)
- Children: 4
- Father: Edward Roper Curzon Clarkson

Geoffrey Teignmouth Clarkson, FCA (October 23, 1878 – June 22, 1949) was a Canadian accountant and auditor known for his expertise in banking audits and corporate rescue. He played a role in shaping the insolvency and bankruptcy law of Canada.

== Early life and education ==
Geoffrey Teignmouth Clarkson was born on October 23, 1878, in Toronto, Ontario, Canada. He was the son of Edward Roper Curzon Clarkson, a notable Canadian accountant and insolvency receiver, and Amy Boydell Lambe. His mother was a grand-niece of John Boydell, her father and grandfather were Wine Merchants and purveyor to King George III and farm landlords to Arthur Young (agriculturist).

Geoffrey grew up in a family deeply involved in the accounting and financial sectors. Unlike his father, all his brothers, and both his sons, GT did not attend Upper Canada College. Instead, he attended the Model School of Toronto and then subsequently the Jarvis Collegiate Institute. At 15, he began work with his father and trained as an accountant.

His family owned William Mulock's former home at 71 Avenue Road, nearly a quarter of Toronto Island (of which Geoffrey's father surveyed).

== Career ==
Clarkson followed in his father's footsteps and became an accountant. He gained recognition for his work in banking audits and corporate rescue. Like his father, GT helped develop key bankruptcy and insolvency reforms in Canada. The firm's training and practices, particularly those of Clarkson, have been used as foundations for modern insolvency and bankruptcy law in the country. GT's 1921 description of the then newly formed Bankruptcy Act of 1920 (the first one since the Insolvent Act repeal in 1885) was often used in legal training as the definitive summary of the act.

His critics - especially those who arose during his receivership of Abitibi-Consolidated - called him a “bank man". At the receivership's conclusion in 1947 was the longest receivership in the history of Canada. It ran 14 years Through that role he earned $600,000.

He was once external auditor of five chartered banks at the same time. During a single year in 1901 that included Canadian Bank of Commerce, the Colonial Investment and Loan Company, Bank of Toronto, Dominion Bank, Imperial Bank and the Standard Bank of Canada. In another year, his business covered the Imperial, Toronto, the Metropolitan Bank of Canada, and the Standard. Politicians at public hearings in Ottawa called him the “bank undertaker” for his reputation for acting as liquidator for defaulted banks and had made such an indelible impact on Conservative Party men through his dutiful service to Government on various royal commissions and crown corporation audits that he was once recommended as minister of finance, made the first external auditor of the Bank of Canada, and asked to help the war effort by helping stabilize monetary policy.

=== Political influence and notoriety ===
GT was noted for being particularly private but politically savvy. He, like ERC was a conservative and GT was extremely close with Ontario Premiers Howard Ferguson. GT frequently advised conservative governments on department efficiencies and was appointed to several royal commissions.

Toronto's Hush magazine claimed in the 1930s that GT was known as "Jesus Christ" amongst the Provincial Conservatives in Queen's Park. A fact which so angered GT that he tried to sue the magazine for libel. He was frequently called upon to provide expert evidence at Queen's Park and in Parliament. GT's opinion was deemed critical when drafting the Banking Act 1923 and no changes to the legislation when in committee were to be made without his approval. He often corresponded with Arthur Meighen when Meighen was both prime minister and a senator when giving evidence to the Select Standing Committee on Banking and Commerce in the House of Commons. His ties to the government were so strong that he was considered for the minister of finance position under Arthur Meighen's government following the King–Byng affair at the urging of prominent Toronto Conservative figure and lawyer I.E. Weldon.

His role as liquidator to failed banks covered at least four by 1923: the Ontario Bank, Home Bank of Canada, the Sovereign Bank, Farmers’ Bank, and the Monarch Bank and had liquidated dozens of other financing institutions including the Dominion Permanent Loan Company. His recommendations as liquidator of the Home Bank of Canada in 1923 set the groundwork for the creation of the Canada Deposit Insurance Corporation.

== Personal life ==
Geoffrey Teignmouth Clarkson's father Edward Roper Curzon Clarkson was a prominent Canadian accountant and had founded Clarkson Gordon & Co in 1864. The Clarkson family was a prominent family in early Toronto.

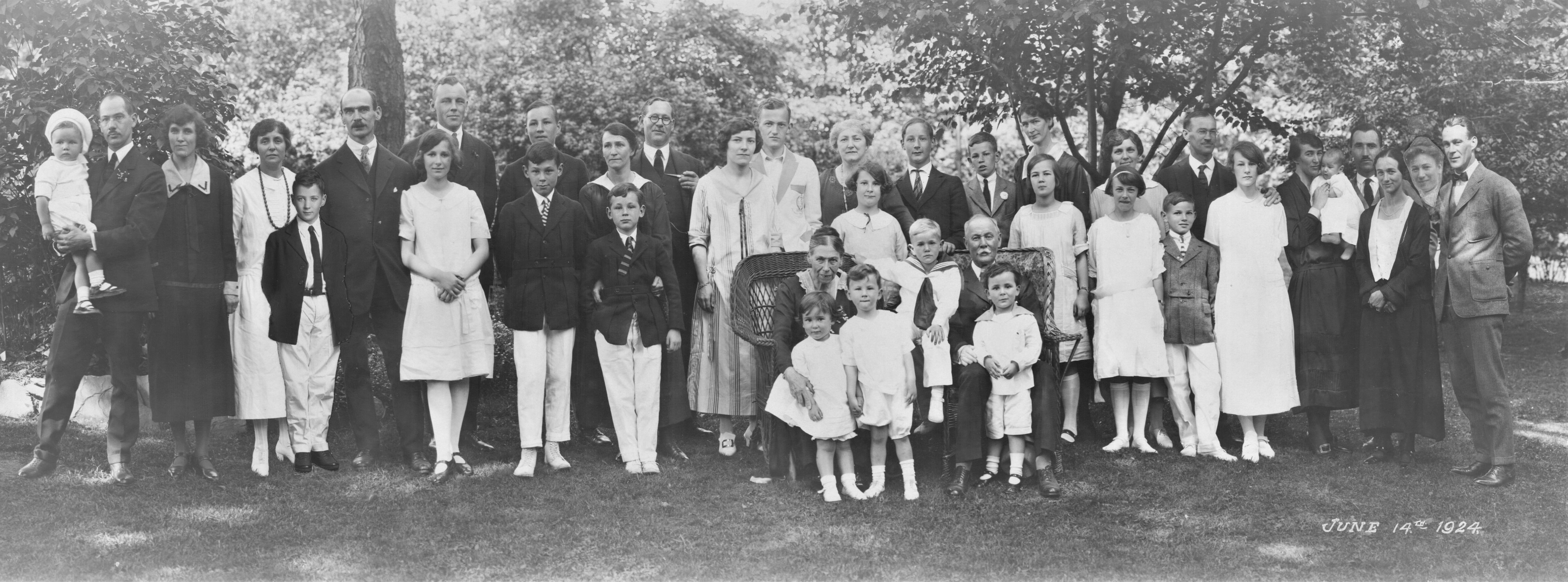
Family photo of Clarkson family of Toronto in ERC's garden at 71 Avenue Road, c.1921

GT married Edith Perry in 1901, whom he likely met through Edith's uncle Alexander Mortimer Smith (who lived next door to the Clarksons at Pembroke Street).

GT was a well known sportsman. He'd lose the boys 50-yard swim in 1890 when he was only 12. He'd race at the Galt Canoe Race in 1892 with Island neighbour G.H. Muntz. Five years later at the Toronto Canoe Club Regatta the Clarkson prowess was on particular display: Fred won the boys swimming, the boys under 18 tandem and boys under 18 gunwale; Roger and Arthur won in the boys’ fours; GT won the club tandem, the gunwale over 18, the tilting. The latter type of race allegedly brought “considerably amusement” to the onlooking crowd. Gunwaling saw contestants stand on the edges of their canoes and paddle standing up. Tilting was even more obscure. “There are two in the boat: one does the paddling and the other is provided with a strong bamboo pole on the end of which is a soft, padded ball. The object is to upset your opponent”. In all his races he would go with Norman C Rolph, relative of perhaps of Toronto's most celebrated architect Ernest Ross Rolph of Sproatt and Rolph. In 1894 he participated in the Centre Island regatta. He placed second in the boys’ 50-yard swim, then first with N.C. Rolph in the boy's tandem rowing and won another trophy for the boy's four in a canoe under 15 with his cousin Lambe. He put on a respectable showing in the open fours, racing with the son of the president of the board of trade C.W. Darling, but they lost out to S Cameron (son of Judge JAG Cameron). He'd also rowed stroke—the lead and pace-setter—for the Argonauts, winning the second heat of the Midsummer Regatta in July 1899.

The Perry family traced its roots to the earliest colonialists in North America. Her mother was Scottish, having emigrated from Scotland in 1850 with her brother Alexander. Her father, American, was a descendant of Canadian senator Ebenezer Washburn Perry and other united empire loyalists from Vermont. Their earliest descendants had arrived in America on the Mayflower. The family lived extremely well on account of a large inheritance received when Edith's mother died. Edith had attended Havergal, and was friends with Florence E. Ward and Laura Muntz Lyall. Laura's husband had been lifelong friends with GT. They had raced together in the Canoe club and for the Argonaut Rowing Club.

Unlike his brothers, GT did not serve in the First World War. One of his brothers, Edward Guy, was awarded the Military Cross in May 1917 after venturing into Battle of Passchendaele no man's land for 21 hours retrieving the dead and wounded. His youngest brother, Maurice, died at Vimmy. In the 1916 edition of The Canadian Annual Review of Public Affairs by J. Castell Hopkins, Hopkins noted that “one of the remarkable features of this war was the patriotism evoked amongst the well-known or prominent families of Canada”, Edward Guy and Maurice Arundel are both listed amongst the names of “well-known families over the length and breadth of Canada” who were represented on War service.

Edith's brothers, Walter and Frank Perry, both fought in Vimy and were both discharged for drunkenness. Both Walter and Frank argued that they were simply “the effects of rum rations on exhausted bodies and over-wrought nerves”.

Probably because of the early exposure to the botany and physical sciences at the Model School, GT and his younger brother Guy each took a keen interest in gardening and in nature. In fact, their mutual love of shooting came from a love of nature. They both enjoyed duck hunts. But GT additionally admired a wider variety of birds. The long hours in wilderness watching and shooting and classifying birds would never fail to reconstitute GT's spirits. Bird watching and ornithology were hobbies of Willie, whom Amy Clarkson called GT's kinsman namesake. Willie had, for some years been “a collector of birds; skins” and had “bought Percy [Travener]’s colour-wash drawings, and nearly every Sunday Percy had dinner either at the Flemings’ or the Lambes”. Percy—himself a world renounced ornithology—later recalled that “from Lambe, I was introduced to an old-world-like courtesy that I had not seen before”. GT had started as a bird watcher just like Willie. As with Percy, Willie was patient, caring, happy to educate. Willie had himself conducted extensive fieldwork, had collected numerous specimens of birds, eggs, and nests. Willie had personally contributed to classifying and describing Lapland Longspurs, was a substantial contributor to the Royal Ontario Museum of Zoology, and eventually the Canadian Museum of Nature.

GT and Edith had four children. Both boys, Robert Curzon and Geoffrey Perry eventually joined Clarkson Gordon & Co in the 1930s. Both sons served during the Second World War. Robert Curzon was a Major in the Royal Regiment of Canada, his younger brother served in wartime procurement. Geoffrey Perry would eventually be awarded an MBE for his Second World War wartime services.

Several of his grandchildren also became members of the firm and remained active in Toronto life.

GT, like his father, provided the accounting and auditing services of the firm to non-profit and charity organisations, particularly educational institutions free of charge. Through the 1930s he served on the board of governors for Havergal College, Upper Canada College, Wycliffe College, and the Hospital for Sick Children.

He died on June 22, 1949, and is buried in Toronto, Ontario, Canada.
