= Canadian accounting profession unification =

Canada was the second nation in the world to formally organize its accounting profession, after the United Kingdom, but it occurred in a fragmented manner by both locality and specialty. It would only begin to experience significant consolidation from 2012 onwards.

After some controversy in the first part of the 20th Century, it has been generally agreed that regulation of the Canadian accounting profession falls within provincial jurisdiction over matters of a local and private nature, (Note: held obiter by the Supreme Court of Canada in Reference Re Securities Act, 2011 SCC 6 at par. 34, [2011] 3 SCR 837 (22 December 2011)) as well as under the provincial education power with respect to training for achieving such professional qualifications.

== Timeline of Canadian accounting bodies ==
Chartered Accountant
Certified Public Accountant
Accredited Public Accountant
Certified General Accountant
CSCA (Note: Canadian Society of Cost Accountants)
Registered Industrial Accountant
Certified Management Accountant
CPA
│
1860
│
1880
│
1900
│
1920
│
1940
│
1960
│
1980
│
2000
│
2020

== Creation of different specialties ==
=== Chartered accountants ===
==== Organization of provincial societies ====
Demand for trained accountants arose as early as the 1840s, when the first Canadian professional accounting firms were organized in Toronto and Montreal.

The Association of Accountants in Montreal was organized as the first accounting organization in North America in 1879 (and only the fifth such organization in the world), and was incorporated by an Act of the Legislative Assembly of Quebec. (Note: An Act to incorporate the Association of Accountants in Montreal, S.Q. 1880, c. 88) Ontario would follow several weeks later with the formation of the Institute of Accountants and Adjusters of Ontario, which was later incorporated as the Institute of Accountants of Ontario in 1882 under the direction of ERC Clarkson, one of the founding members of Clarkson Gordon & Co, and a key member in the growth of the accounting and insolvency an consulting industry in Canada. E.R.C. acted as a frequent advisor to the Canadian Senate in regard to the banking committee. (Note: An Act to Incorporate the Institute of Accountants of Ontario, S.O. 1883, c. 62) It was reconstituted as the Institute of Chartered Accountants of Ontario ("ICAO") in 1911. (Note: An Act respecting Chartered Accountants, S.O. 1911, c. 48)

As the AAM tended to have an anglophone membership, the Institute of Accountants and Auditors of the Province of Quebec was later incorporated to service growing demand within Quebec's francophone population. (Note: Loi constituant en corporation l'Institut des comptables et auditeurs de la Province de Québec, S.Q. 1912-13, c. 94) In 1919, the AAM began to offer admission for members of the IAAPQ.

Manitoba would be the third province to organize its chartered accountants, and it would later be instrumental in organizing similar professional bodies in British Columbia, Alberta and Saskatchewan.

Nova Scotia organized in 1900, (Note: An Act to incorporate the Institute of Chartered Accountants of Nova Scotia, S.N.S. 1900, c. 154) followed by New Brunswick in 1916 (Note: S.N.B. 1916, c. 53) and Prince Edward Island in 1921. (Note: S.P.E.I. 1921, c. 25) The latter two bodies were organized in an irregular manner compared to those of other provinces, (Note: the New Brunswick Institute conferred membership on anyone who was a member of any incorporated society of accountants in the British Empire or the United States, and the PEI Institute was formed without the knowledge or consent of existing CAs.) which resulted in their qualifications not being recognized by Nova Scotia until 1925, and by Quebec and Ontario until 1926.

Outside Canada, the Dominion of Newfoundland incorporated the Institute of Accountants in 1905, (Note: An Act to Incorporate the Institute of Accountants of Newfoundland, S.N. 1905, c. 16) but was pressured to revoke statutory protection of its designation the following year. (Note: An Act to Amend 5 Ed. VII., Cap. 16, entitled "An Act to Incorporate the Institute of Accountants of Newfoundland", S.N. 1906, c. 29) This was not reversed until Newfoundland joined Confederation in 1949. (Note: Chartered Accountants Act, 1949, S.N. 1949, c. 30)

= statutory protection of CA designation
= organization without statutory protection

Quebec
Association of Accountants in Montreal
SCAPQ (Note: Society of Chartered Accountants of the Province of Quebec: Loi modifiant la charte de l'Association des comptables de Montréal, S.Q. 1927, c. 101)
Institute of Chartered Accountants of Quebec (Note: An Act to regulate the practice of accountancy and auditing, S.Q. 1946, c. 47)
Ontario
(Note: Institute of Accountants and Adjusters of Ontario)
Institute of Accountants of Ontario (Note: Only the designation "Fellow of the Chartered Accountants" ("FCA") was protected)
Institute of Chartered Accountants of Ontario
Manitoba
Chartered Accountants' Association of Manitoba (Note: S.M. 1886, c. 66; reenacted as The Chartered Accountants' Association Act, R.S.M. 1892, c. 19)
Institute of Chartered Accountants of Manitoba (Note: S.M. 1913, c. 1; reenacted as The Chartered Accountants' Act, R.S.M. 1913, c. 29)
Nova Scotia
ICANS
Institute of Chartered Accountants of Nova Scotia (Note: An Act to amend Chapter 154, Acts of 1900, entitled, "An Act to Incorporate the Institute of Chartered Accountants of Nova Scotia", S.N.S. 1913, c. 154)
British Columbia
ICABC (Note: Chartered Accountants Act, 1905, S.B.C. 1905, c. 59)
Institute of Chartered Accountants of British Columbia
Newfoundland / Newfoundland and Labrador
(Note: protection of "FCA" designation only)
Institute of Accountants of Newfoundland (Note: statutory protection removed)
Institute of Chartered Accountants of Newfoundland
Saskatchewan
Institute of Chartered Accountants of Saskatchewan (Note: S.S. 1908, c. 55)
Alberta
Institute of Chartered Accountants of Alberta (Note: An Act to Incorporate the Institute of Chartered Accountants of Alberta, S.A. 1910 (2nd Sess.), c. 43)
New Brunswick
Institute of Chartered Accountants of New Brunswick (Note: Chartered Accountants Act, S.N.B. 1916, c. 53 , as amended by An Act to amend an Act to Incorporate The New Brunswick Institute of Chartered Accountants, S.N.B. 1930, c. 51)
Prince Edward Island
ICAPEI
Institute of Chartered Accountants of Prince Edward Island
Yukon
ICAY (Note: Institute of Chartered Accountants of Yukon: S.Y. 1976 (3rd Sess.), c. 2)
Northwest Territories / Nunavut
ICANWT (Note: Institute of Chartered Accountants of the Northwest Territories: S.N.W.T. 1979, c. 16)
│
1860
│
1880
│
1900
│
1920
│
1940
│
1960
│
1980
│
2000
│
2020

==== Attempt to nationalize the profession ====
Tensions erupted following a disciplinary hearing in 1890 held by the Institute of Accountants of Ontario into an audit conducted with respect to Confederation Life. While the action itself affirmed the importance of auditor independence, it caused a rift in the IAO membership and the resignation of several prominent members of the governing Council in 1891 including the IAO's first president Edward Rope Curzon Clarkson.

The early CA bodies, with the exception of the AAM, also started to relax their entrance requirements to allow the admission of accountants who were not in public practice. An initial effort to create a national organization in 1901 was quashed due to local opposition, but this caused a concerted effort, sponsored by the AAM, to create one that would be restricted to practicing accountants. As a result, the Dominion Association of Chartered Accountants ("DACA") was created in 1902, in an attempt to create a national status for the profession through direct entry of qualified applicants to membership. (Note: An Act to incorporate the Dominion Association of Chartered Accountants, S.C. 1902, c. 58) Again, the DACA saw the seminal involvement of ERC Clarkson.

Ontario passed an Act in 1908 granting the ICAO exclusive rights to the CA designation, (Note: An Act to revise and amend The Chartered Accountants Act, S.O. 1908, c. 42) and, on DACA's petition, the Governor in Council disallowed it in 1909, on grounds of federal paramountcy in having created a national body, as described in a memo by Minister of Justice and Attorney General of Canada Sir Allen Aylesworth recommending the measure. A subsequent 1910 Act (Note: An Act to revise and amend The Chartered Accountants Act, S.O. 1910, c. 79) was disallowed for similar reasons in 1911. (Note: P.C. 610, P.C. 611 (March 24, 1911)) With the mediation of the President of the British Society of Incorporated Accountants at a meeting in Chicago, the ICAO and DACA leaders subsequently reached an agreement in which DACA would be reorganized as a federation of the provincial Institutes effective from 1909. (Note: A concurrent intercession by the Colonial Office ensured that British CAs would be able to gain admission to Canadian CA bodies, thus introducing recognition provisions into Canadian practice.) The Act was subsequently passed again in 1911, with a concession granted to accountants who were members of DACA on December 16, 1909.

DACA would become the Canadian Institute of Chartered Accountants in 1951. (Note: An Act respecting the Dominion Association of Chartered Accountants, S.C. 1951, c. 89) It would expand internationally in 1973, when the Institute of Chartered Accountants of Bermuda was incorporated and subsequently obtained affiliation with the CICA.

=== Certified general accountants ===
The creation of large business and governmental organizations increased the demand for accountants on their payrolls, which called for efforts to address their unique needs without the necessity of apprenticeships demanded by the CA firms. The Canadian Association of Accountants was formed in 1908, arising from a technical self-study group of accountants working at the Canadian Pacific Railway, which led to the creation of the General Accountants Association in 1913. (Note: It had to change its name because of opposition from the CA bodies, as "CAA" would have been too similar a designation to use.) (Note: An Act to incorporate the General Accountants Association, S.C. 1913, c. 116) Despite initial assurances that its members would refrain from practicing public accounting, it began advertising examinations in that field in 1917, thus triggering conflicts with the CA bodies that would last for decades.

Because of such protracted opposition, it was only in 1999 that the GAA was able to change its name to the Certified General Accountants Association of Canada. (Note: An Act respecting the Certified General Accountants Association of Canada, S.C. 1999, c. 38) Over the years, portions of its membership would be admitted into membership of other professional bodies, such as the admission into Quebec's Association of Accountants in 1920, (Note: S.Q. 1919-20, c. 118) the CGA/CA merger in Quebec in 1946, the CGA/CPA merger in 1949, and the CGA/CPA merger in Manitoba in 1950.

= statutory protection of CGA designation
= organization without statutory protection

Quebec
CGAAPQ (Note: Certified General Accountants' Association of Quebec: Quebec Certified General Accountants' Act, S.Q. 1946, c. 89)
PCCGAQ (Note: Professional Corporation of Certified General Accountants of Quebec: Professional Code, S.Q. 1973, c. 43, ss. 202-205)
OPCGLQ (Note: Ordre professionnel des comptables généraux licenciés du Québec: Loi modifiant le Code des professions et d'autres lois professionnelles, L.Q. 1994, c. 40)
Ontario
(Note: Certified General Accountants Association of Ontario; later merged with CPAAO (with exception of part of the Toronto branch))
CGAAO (Note: Certified General Accountants Association of Ontario re-established; reincorporated in 1957 with additional objectives relating to education)
CGAAO (Note: Certified General Accountants Association of Ontario Act, 1983, S.O. 1983, c. Pr6)
CGAO (Note: Certified General Accountants of Ontario: Certified General Accountants Act, 2010, S.O. 2010, c. 6, Sch. A)
British Columbia
Certified General Accountants Association of British Columbia (Note: Certified General Accountants Act, S.B.C. 1951, c. 2)
Prince Edward Island
Certified General Accountants Association of Prince Edward Island (Note: S.P.E.I. 1951, c. 64)
New Brunswick
Certified General Accountants Association of New Brunswick (Note: Certified General Accountants' Act, S.N.B. 1961-62, c. 93)
Manitoba
Certified General Accountants Association of Manitoba (Note: S.M. 1973, c. 38)
Saskatchewan
Certified General Accountants Association of Saskatchewan (Note: The Certified General Accountants Act, 1978, S.S. 1978, c. 6)
Northwest Territories / Nunavut
Certified General Accountants Association of NWT (Note: S.N.W.T. 1979, c. 14)
Yukon
Certified General Accountants Association of Yukon (Note: S.Y. 1983, c. 14)
Alberta
Certified General Accountants Association of Alberta (Note: Certified General Accountants Act, S.A. 1984, c. C-3.5)
Newfoundland and Labrador
Certified General Accountants Association of Newfoundland and Labrador (Note: S.N.L. 1984, c. 27)
Nova Scotia
CGAANS (Note: Certified General Accountants Association of Nova Scotia: Certified General Accountants Act, S.N.S. 1998, c. 10)
│
1860
│
1880
│
1900
│
1920
│
1940
│
1960
│
1980
│
2000
│
2020

=== Cost and management accounting: from CA possession to the creation of RIAs and CMAs ===
Towards the end of the First World War, several significant issues forced organizations to invest resources into the creation of cost accounting functions:

- the Russian Revolution, together with worldwide labour unrest, created pressure on business organizations to demonstrate that they were earning fair returns;
- wartime procurement by the Imperial Munitions Board and the introduction of income tax (Note: The Business Profits War Tax Act, 1916, S.C. 1916, c. 11) (Note: The Income War Tax Act, 1917, S.C. 1917, c. 28) necessitated proving the actual cost of manufacturing goods; and
- the high rate of postwar bankruptcies brought about by the Post–World War I recession and the Depression of 1920–21 created the need to demonstrate that the price of manufactured goods covered their cost.

In a move designed to prevent the newly created General Accountants Association from moving into that field, DACA created the Canadian Society of Cost Accountants ("CSCA"), with membership originally restricted to chartered accountants.

The CSCA would initiate efforts to standardize education in cost accounting, and entered into an affiliation agreement with the US National Association of Cost Accountants in 1922. When the CSCA tried to obtain NACA's educational materials at a more reasonable cost in 1926, NACA proposed a merger of the two organizations. This was rejected, and the affiliation was subsequently dissolved. The Society began to issue "Certificates of efficiency" in 1927 to its graduates.

In the 1930s, there would be internal tensions as to what areas of company accounting the CSCA should focus on, and, in 1939, members wishing to concentrate more on management accounting left to form the Controllers' Institute of Canada (later part of the Financial Executives Institute).

When provincial societies began to be formed in 1941, the "Registered Industrial and Cost Accountant" ("RIA") was created for its members. (Note: The Society of Industrial and Cost Accountants of Ontario Act, 1941, S.O. 1941, c. 77) This initiative was generally accepted in most provinces, but there was resistance in British Columbia as the promoters of that effort were only CGAs and independent accountants. It would pass only when the enabling Act specified that the RIA designation was available only to those members who were also CAs.

The designation was simplified as "Registered Industrial Accountant" in some, but not all, provinces around 1967. (Note: The Society of Industrial Accountants of Ontario Act, 1967, S.O. 1967, c. 129) It would be replaced by the Certified Management Accountant ("CMA") designation beginning in 1976, but the province-by-province implementation would be completed only in 1985.

= Licentiate of the Cost and Management Institute ("LCMI")
= Registered Industrial and Cost Accountant/Registered Industrial Accountant "(RIA")
= Registered Management Accountant ("RMA")
= Certified Management Accountant ("CMA")

Quebec
CMI (Note: Cost and Management Institute: Loi constituant en corporation l'Institut de gestion industrielle et commerciale, S.Q. 1941, c. 95)
SICAQ (Note: Society of Industrial and Cost Accountants of Quebec: An Act to amend the charter of the Cost and Management Institute, S.Q. 1948, c. 95)
SIAQ (Note: Society of Industrial Accountants of Quebec: Loi constituant en corporation l'Institut de gestion industrielle et commerciale, S.Q. 1968, c. 111)
PCIAQ (Note: Professional Corporation of Industrial Accountants of Quebec: Professional Code, S.Q. 1973, c. 43, ss. 198-201)
PCMAQ (Note: Loi portant changement du nom de la Corporation professionnelle des comptables en administration industrielle du Québec et du titre de ses membres, L.Q. 1987, c. 17)
OPCMAQ (Note: Ordre professionel des comptables en management accredités: Loi modifiant le Code des professions et d'autres lois professionnelles, L.Q. 1994, c. 40)
Ontario
SICAO (Note: The Society of Industrial and Cost Accountants of Ontario Act, 1941, S.O. 1941, c. 77)
SIAO (Note: The Society of Industrial Accountants of Ontario Act, 1967, S.O. 1967, c. 129)
SMAO (Note: The Society of Management Accountants of Ontario Act, 1981, S.O. 1981, c. 100)
CMAO (Note: Certified Management Accountants of Ontario: Certified Management Accountants Act, 2010, S.O. 2010, c. 6, Sch. B)
Alberta
(Note: The Society of Industrial Accountants of Alberta Act, 1944, S.A. 1944, c. 79)
(Note: Society of Management Accountants of Alberta Amendment Act, 1985, S.A. 1985, c. 63)
British Columbia
(Note: Society of Industrial Accountants of British Columbia Act, S.B.C. 1945, c. 81)
(Note: Society of Industrial Accountants of British Columbia Amendment Act, S.B.C. 1977, c. 84)
Manitoba
(Note: S.M. 1947, c. 101)
<
Saskatchewan
(Note: The Industrial and Cost Accountants Act, 1948, S.S. 1948, c. 74)
(Note: An Act to amend The Industrial Accountants Act, S.S. 1978, c. 26)
New Brunswick
(Note: The Industrial and Cost Accountants Act, 1948, S.N.B. 1950, c. 55)
(Note: An Act to Amend An Act to Incorporate The Society of Industrial and Cost Accountants of New Brunswick, S.N.B. 1977, c. 62)
Nova Scotia
(Note: Society of Industrial and Cost Accountants of Nova Scotia Act, S.N.S. 1950, c. 95)
(Note: An Act to amend Chapter 95 of the Acts of 1950, the Society of Management Accountants of Nova Scotia Act, S.N.S. 1983, c. 95)
Newfoundland and Labrador
(Note: The Industrial and Cost Accountants Act, 1951, S.N. 1951, c. 69)
(Note: An Act to change the corporate name of the Society of Industrial Accountants of Newfoundland, S.N. 1977, c. 9)
(Note: An Act to amend the Management Accountants Act, S.N. 1978, c. 62)
Prince Edward Island
(Note: S.P.E.I. 1951, c. 34)
(Note: S.P.E.I. 1977, c. 52)
Yukon
(Note: S.Y. 1975 (2nd Sess.), c. 2)
(Note: S.Y. 1983, c. 28)
Northwest Territories / Nunavut
(Note: S.N.W.T. 1982 (3rd Sess.), c. 17)
│
1860
│
1880
│
1900
│
1920
│
1940
│
1960
│
1980
│
2000
│
2020

=== Certified public accountants: the first CPAs ===
The first Canadian CPA designation arose from several parallel moves:

- In Quebec, the Licentiate in Accountancy was first granted by McGill University in 1918, which was granted statutory recognition as a professional designation in 1920. (Note: Loi constituant en corporation l'Association des comptables, S.Q. 1919-20, c. 118 (in French)) It was subsequently replaced by "Certified Public Accountant" in 1927. (Note: Loi modifiant la Loi des comptables, S.Q. 1927, c. 61 (in French))
- In English Canada, the Society of Incorporated Accountants and Auditors was formed in 1918 and incorporated in 1919 by members of the GAA. It would become the United Accountants and Auditors of Canada in 1920, conferring the "United Accountant" ("UA") designation. (Note: The UA designation was held not to infringe the protected designation of CA. (Note: Institute of Chartered Accountants of Manitoba v Bellamy, 1926 CanLII 242, [1926] 4 DLR 230 (7 July 1926), Court of Queen's Bench (Manitoba, Canada))) It would later engage in a failed attempt to take over the GAA.
- In Ontario, the UAs (formed mainly from accountants and auditors working in government tax offices) were successful in obtaining statutory recognition as the Association of Accountants and Auditors. The designation originated as LA (Licentiate in Accountancy) during 1926–1931, (Note: The Association of Accountants and Auditors Act, 1926, S.O. 1926, c. 124) changing to IPA (Incorporated Public Accountant) during 1931–1936, (Note: The Association of Accountants and Auditors Act, 1931, S.O. 1931, c. 143) before becoming CPA. (Note: The Certified Public Accountants Act, 1936, S.O. 1936, c. 68)

The CPAs subsequently gained statutory recognition in most, but not all, provinces. Because of CA opposition in Nova Scotia, it was only able to use the designation of "Registered Public Accountant".

The Quebec CPAs were forced to merge with the ICAPQ in 1946 upon the reorganization of the Quebec profession. (Note: S.Q. 1946, c. 47, s. 14) In 1962, the CAs and CPAs agreed to merge nationally, and the remaining provincial CPA bodies either dissolved or became dormant.

= Member of General Accountants Association
= Licentiate in Accountancy
= Incorporated Public Accountant
= Certified Public Accountant
= Registered Public Accountant
= organization without statutory protection
= organization dormant after CA/CPA merger

Quebec
AA (Note: Association of Accountants: Loi constituant en corporation l'Association des comptables, S.Q. 1919-20, c. 118 (in French))
CPAPQ (Note: Corporation of Public Accountants of the Province of Quebec: Loi modifiant la Loi des comptables, S.Q. 1927, c. 61 (in French))
Ontario
AAAO (Note: Association of Accountants and Auditors of Ontario)
AAAO
Certified Public Accountants Association of Ontario
Manitoba
CPAAM (Note: The Manitoba Certified Public Accountants Act, 1950, S.M. 1950 (1st Session), c. 103)
New Brunswick
CPAANB (Note: The Certified Public Accountants' Association of New Brunswick Act, S.N.B. 1951, c. 41)
Nova Scotia
RPAANS (Note: Registered Public Accountants' Association of Nova Scotia: The Registered Public Accountants' Association Act, S.N.S. 1952, c. 128)
Newfoundland and Labrador
CPAAN (Note: Certified Public Accountants Association of Newfoundland: The Certified Public Accountants Act, 1950, S.N. 1950, c. 35) (Note: Chartered Accountants and Certified Public Accountants (Merger) Act, S.N. 1966-67, c. 42)
(Note: Certified Public Accountants Act Repeal Act, S.N.L. 2008, c. 39) (Note: Chartered Accountants and Certified Public Accountants Merger Act Repeal Act, S.N.L. 2008, c. 40)
│
1860
│
1880
│
1900
│
1920
│
1940
│
1960
│
1980
│
2000
│
2020

=== Accredited public accountants ===
The "International Society of Commerce" ("ISC") was first noted in an advertisement in Hamilton, Ontario, as early as 1921, and its members were conferred with the designation of "Accredited Public Accountant" ("APA"). The ISC, located in Winnipeg, formed the "Institute of Accredited Public Accountants" in 1938, which was federally incorporated in 1946. It initially attempted to organize a provincial institute in British Columbia in 1937, but failed to receive legislative approval.

When Quebec consolidated the auditing profession in 1946, APAs in the province who had practiced accounting continuously from 1942 received statutory recognition in Quebec. The APA designation later received statutory protection in New Brunswick, Manitoba and Saskatchewan.

An attempt was made to form a body in Ontario by way of private bill in 1949, (Note: Bill 5, 1st Session, 23rd Legislature (Ontario, 1949)) but it was withdrawn at second reading on grounds advanced by the CA and CPA bodies that a public bill would be a more appropriate choice for action. That option was never subsequently pursued. Similar efforts to secure recognition in British Columbia and Alberta were also pursued at the time, but they failed as well. Provincial societies were later organized in British Columbia and Ontario in 1957.

The APAs would later consolidate with other accounting organizations. They merged with the CPAs in New Brunswick in 1952, but other APAs revived the organization in 1961. (Note: reactivated upon writ of mandamus issued by the New Brunswick Court of Appeal (Note: Ex Parte Goodwin et al, 1961 CanLII 421, 27 DLR (2d) 667 (24 March 1961), Court of Appeal (New Brunswick, Canada))) Later efforts by other provincial bodies to merge with the CGAs proved to be more conclusive. The Ontario society, however, decided in 1963 to restrict its membership to those members who held public accounting licenses. As no future licenses would be conferred on APAs after 1962 as a result of that year's reorganization of the Public Accountants Council, it would gradually cease to exist over time.

While the APA designation is not now recognized by any Canadian jurisdiction as a professional designation in active usage, the Canadian Institute of Accredited Public Accountants continues to exist, in alliance with the Society of Professional Accountants of Canada. The SPAC confers the APA designation as an honorary title to Registered Professional Accountants of distinction.

= statutory protection of APA designation
= organization dormant after CGA/APA merger
= organization dormant after CPA/APA merger

New Brunswick
(Note: The New Brunswick Accredited Public Accountants Act, 1947, S.N.B. 1947, c. 166 . Act was only repealed upon the creation of the Chartered Professional Accountants in 2014.)
(Note: dormant when the majority of APAs agreed to join the CPAs)
Manitoba
IAPAM (Note: Institute of Accredited Public Accountants of Manitoba: The Manitoba Accredited Public Accountants Act, S.M. 1950 (1st), c. 100)
(Note: repealed: The Private Acts Repeal Act, S.M. 1988-89, c. 16)
Saskatchewan
IAPAS (Note: Institute of Accredited Public Accountants of Saskatchewan: The Accredited Public Accountants Act, 1977, S.S. 1976-77, c. 1) (Note: repealed: The Certified General Accountants Amendment Act, 1998, S.S. 1998, c. 11)
│
1860
│
1880
│
1900
│
1920
│
1940
│
1960
│
1980
│
2000
│
2020

== Creation of uniform accounting standards ==
From 1946, the chartered accountants took the initiative to codify generally accepted accounting principles and generally accepted auditing standards in Canada:

- DACA's Accounting and Auditing Research Committee began to issuing bulletins in 1946, setting out recommended standards of practice on accounting and auditing.
- The CICA started the production of research studies in 1963 on topics of current interest to the profession.
- The CICA Handbook was created in 1968 to consolidate the CICA's pronouncements. Its requirements would attain mandatory in 1975, through regulations issued under the Canada Business Corporations Act. (Note: currently the Canada Business Corporations Regulations, 2001, SOR/2001-512)
- The International Financial Reporting Standards and International Auditing Standards would be incorporated by reference in the Handbook, effective in 2011.
- It would be renamed in 2014 as the CPA Canada Handbook.

== Licensing of public accounting ==
In addition to conferring exclusive rights to use specified designations on the members of the various professional bodies, most provinces have also required those who pursued public accounting to obtain a separate permit. The permit is issued by:

1. a specified professional body, either with or without the supervision of a provincial agency;
2. a provincial agency (which could be effectively dominated by a professional body), either generally or where a qualified accountant does not belong to a specified body (as in BC from 1973). (Note: Companies Act, S.B.C. 1973, c. 18, s. 203; currently Business Corporations Act, S.B.C. 2002, c. 57, Part 7, Div. 4)

= permits issued by independent licensing board
= permits issued by local professional bodies, under supervision of provincial agency
= permits issued by local professional body

Quebec
ICAQ (Note: An Act to regulate the practice of accountancy and auditing, S.Q. 1946, c. 47)
OPQ (Note: An Act to amend the Professional Code and the Chartered Accountants Act in respect of public accountancy, L.Q. 2007, c. 42)
Prince Edward Island
ICAPEI
CPAPEI
Ontario
Public Accountants Council of the Province of Ontario (Note: The Public Accountancy Act, 1950, S.O. 1950, c. 60)
PACPO (Note: The Public Accounting Act, 2004, S.O. 2004, c. 8)
CPAO (Note: Accelerating Access to Justice Act, 2021, S.O. 2021, c. 4, Sch. 7)
Nova Scotia
Public Accountants Board of Nova Scotia (Note: Public Accountants Act, S.N.S. 1952, c. 14 , repealed by Financial Measures (2019) Act, S.N.S. 2019, c. 4, Part IX)
CPANS
Newfoundland and Labrador
Public Accountants Licensing Board (Newfoundland and Labrador) (Note: Public Accountancy Act, S.N. 1966-67, c. 45)
CPANL
Alberta
ICAA (Note: Chartered Accountants Act, S.A. 1987, c. C-5.1)
ICAA, CGAA, CMAA (Note: Regulated Accounting Profession Act, S.A. 1999, c. R-12.3)
CPAA
│
1940
│
1950
│
1960
│
1970
│
1980
│
1990
│
2000
│
2010
│
2020
│
2030

== Consolidation: Rise of the Chartered Professional Accountants (2012-) ==
=== Implementation by jurisdiction ===
The various provincial bodies were federated nationally in the following bodies:

- Canadian Institute of Chartered Accountants
- Certified General Accountants Association of Canada
- Society of Management Accountants of Canada

After a failed merger attempt in 2004, the CAs and CMAs began new discussions in 2011, and invited the CGAs to participate. While the three national bodies supported merger discussions, there was significant tension among their memberships, notably within the CAs, and at one point the CGAs and CMAs in Ontario withdrew from talks because of concerns over the potential loss of their identity. Proponents of the proposal argued that it would strengthen the influence, relevance and contribution of the Canadian accounting profession with domestic and international stakeholders and serve the public interest through common codes of conduct, disciplinary systems and licensing regimes.

Even though the legislative process took seven years to complete, the implementation was greeted with little controversy, with implementing bills generally receiving quick passage.

CPA implementation by jurisdiction
Jurisdiction	Enabling legislation	Royal assent (Note: known as Commissioner's assent in the Territories)	In force	Designation in effect
British Columbia	Miscellaneous Statutes Amendment Act, 2014, S.B.C. 2014, c. 14, Part 1	May 29, 2014	May 29, 2014 (Note: With respect only to authorization of the designation's use by members of the three BC accounting bodies)	September 18, 2013 (CA); September 20, 2013 (CGA); November 9, 2013 (CMA)
British Columbia	Chartered Professional Accountants Act, S.B.C. 2015, c. 1	March 25, 2015	June 24, 2015	September 18, 2013 (CA); September 20, 2013 (CGA); November 9, 2013 (CMA)
Yukon	Chartered Professional Accountants Act, S.Y. 2016, c. 8	May 19, 2016	Interim board appointed June 17, 2016; Act in force July 18, 2016	July 18, 2016
Alberta	Chartered Professional Accountants Act, S.A. 2014, c. C-10.2	December 17, 2014	July 1, 2015	July 1, 2015
Northwest Territories	Chartered Professional Accountants Act, S.N.W.T. 2018, c. 13	November 1, 2018	January 8, 2019	January 8, 2019
Nunavut	Chartered Professional Accountants Act, S.Nu. 2018, c. 15	November 8, 2018	January 8, 2019	January 8, 2019
Saskatchewan	The Accounting Profession Act, S.S. 2014, c. A-3.1	May 14, 2014	November 10, 2014	November 10, 2014
Manitoba	The Chartered Professional Accountants Act, S.M. 2015, c. 5 (C.C.S.M., c. C71)	June 30, 2015	ss. 99-100, (Note: Offences) 109-110 (Note: Interim title restrictions and transitional board) on June 30, 2015 s. 38(2)-(4) (Note: Exclusive right to provide reserved public accounting services) on September 1, 2016 (Note: one year after proclamation of Act) remainder of Act on September 1, 2015	July 15, 2015
Ontario	Chartered Professional Accountants of Ontario Act, 2017, S.O. 2017, c. 8, Sch. 3	May 17, 2017	May 17, 2017	November 1, 2012 (CA); April 1, 2014 (CMA); July 2, 2014 (CGA)
Quebec	Chartered Professional Accountants Act, S.Q. 2012, c. 11	May 16, 2012	May 16, 2012	May 16, 2012
New Brunswick	Chartered Professional Accountants Act, S.N.B. 2014, c. 28	May 21, 2014	September 1, 2014	September 1, 2014
Nova Scotia	Chartered Professional Accountants Act, S.N.S. 2015, c. 5	May 11, 2015	ss. 13, 14(2)-(5) and 15 (Note: Use of legacy and protected designations; offences) on July 1, 2015 remainder of Act on May 11, 2015	July 1, 2015
Nova Scotia	Chartered Professional Accountants Act, S.N.S. 2015, c. 30 (Note: amended by the Financial Measures (2018) Act, S.N.S. 2018, c. 4, Part I , to provide that, unless otherwise authorized by CPANS, a legacy designation may be used only by someone entitled to use it prior to August 2, 2016)	December 18, 2015	August 2, 2016 (Note: At which time the previous Act was repealed.)	July 1, 2015
Prince Edward Island	Chartered Professional Accountants and Public Accounting Act, S.P.E.I. 2014, c. 2	November 27, 2014	April 1, 2015	May 1, 2014
Newfoundland and Labrador	Chartered Professional Accountants and Public Accountants Act, S.N.L. 2014, c. C-10.1	December 16, 2014	January 9, 2015	January 9, 2015
Bermuda	Institute of Chartered Accountants of Bermuda Amendment Act 2014 (PDF) (8). 2014. (Note: retitling the principal Act as the Chartered Professional Accountants of Bermuda Act 1973 (PDF) (93). 1973.)	March 26, 2014	April 11, 2014	April 11, 2014

Federal recognition of the merger involved the amendment of various Acts to reflect the change of designation:

CPA recognition by the Parliament of Canada
Jurisdiction	Enabling legislation	Royal assent	In force
Canada	Miscellaneous Statute Law Amendment Act, 2017, S.C. 2017, c. 26, s. 62	December 12, 2017	December 12, 2017

=== Reservation of other designations and descriptions by jurisdiction ===
In addition to preserving the legacy CA, CGA and CMA professional designations (and thus barring them from use by other accountants), the following are also protected:

Protected phrases and designations by jurisdiction
Jurisdiction	Identification as public accountant	Protected heritage designations						Protected descriptions						
Jurisdiction	Identification as public accountant	AAPA (Note: Associate of the Accredited Public Accountants)	ACA (Note: Associate of the Chartered Accountants)	APA (Note: Accredited Public Accountant)	CPA* (Note: Certified Public Accountant)	GA (Note: General Accountant)	RIA (Note: Registered Industrial Accountant)	professional accountant	public accountant	auditor	qualified auditor	accountant	certified accountant	recognized accountant
British Columbia			✓ (Note: Legacy Designations Regulation, B.C. Reg. 114/2015)		✓ (Note: or Certified Public Auditor)		✓	✓ (Note: or the initials "PA")					✓	
Yukon					✓			✓						
Alberta			✓	✓	✓		✓	✓						
Northwest Territories		✓	✓	✓	✓	✓	✓	✓					✓	
Nunavut														
Saskatchewan		✓	✓	✓	✓		✓	✓						
Manitoba				✓ (Note: or Public Accountant)	✓ (Note: or Certified Practising Accountant)		✓	✓	✓					
Ontario	LPA (Note: Licensed Public Accountant) (Note: required under PACPO Standard 17(4)(g))		✓				✓		✓ (Note: protected by virtue of the Public Accounting Act, 2004, S.O. 2004, c. 8)			✓ (Note: in relation to the holder of an accounting designation, it does not extend to an accountant that does not reside, have an office in, or offers or provides accounting services in, Ontario)		
Quebec	Auditor (Note: in French, "auditeur" or "auditrice") (Note: attached to principal designation, expressed as "CPA Auditor", "CPA auditeur" or "CPA auditrice")							✓	✓					
New Brunswick			✓	✓	✓	✓	✓ (Note: known as Registered Industrial and Cost Accountant)	✓	✓	✓	✓	✓	✓	✓
Nova Scotia	LPA				✓				✓					
Prince Edward Island									✓					
Newfoundland and Labrador	LPA		✓ (Note: legacy designation: holders must identify themselves as "ACPA, ACA")		✓		✓		✓					
Bermuda			✓		✓			✓						

In addition, Yukon and British Columbia have several other protected designations in use:

- AAT ("Associate Accounting Technologist")
- ACPA ("Associate of the Chartered Professional Accountants")

Yukon also grants an honorary designation known as "CPA (Hon)".

Alberta has opted to allow all those with legacy designations to use them in conjunction with "CPA" during the first 10 years from July 1, 2015, or to use the legacy designation alone during that time. After the 10-year transition period, the "CPA" designation can be used on its own by such legacy holders.

=== Implementation in Quebec ===
The unification initiative was the fifth such move since 1973, in which Quebec's accounting bodies sought to merge.

On March 28, 2012, a bill was tabled in the National Assembly of Quebec to create the Ordre des comptables professionnels agréés du Québec. It subsequently received Royal Assent on May 16, 2012, and went into force on the same date.

=== Implementation in Ontario ===
The implementation of the designation in Ontario followed a complex route:

- On May 15, 2012, CGAs and CMAs in Ontario announced that they were withdrawing from merger discussions in that province.
- On October 25, 2012, the Institute of Chartered Accountants of Ontario announced the adoption of bylaw and regulation amendments to provide for the implementation of the CPA designation with respect to its members effective November 1, 2012, with mandatory usage from July 1, 2013. This was said to be possible as "CPA" became a protected designation within the control of the Institute following the 1960s merger with the province's certified public accountants., (Note: by virtue of The Certified Public Accountants Act, R.S.O. 1937, c. 236, as amended by S.O. 1953, c. 13 (since repealed by the Legislation Act, 2006, s. 98(3), as enacted by the Access to Justice Act, 2006, S.O. 2006, c. 21, Sch. F ): see "Table of Repealed Public Statutes: Part II – Repealed Unconsolidated Public Statutes". e-laws.gov.on.ca. Service Ontario. Archived from the original on November 12, 2010.) but is currently based upon trademark registration.
- On November 16, 2012, CMA Ontario announced that it intended to reenter discussions, but only after ICAO had undertaken the creation of CPA Ontario.
- On November 27, 2012, CGA Ontario announced that it still favoured integration, but only "under the right circumstances".
- On May 1, 2013, both the ICAO and CMA Ontario released statements to their members notifying them that their organizations have entered into a Memorandum of Understanding (MOU), signalling the commencement of formal unification negotiations, following the official merger of the national CA and CMA organizations. A proposal was introduced to the members in May, with subsequent approval by members from both organizations in June 2013.
- In June 2013, the ICAO adopted the business name of "Chartered Professional Accountants of Ontario" ("CPA Ontario").
- On October 24, 2013, CGA Ontario returned to unification discussions and announced that they had also signed the MOU as of February 3, 2014.
- Effective April 1, 2014, CMA Ontario members officially became associate members of CPA Ontario, thus entitled to use the CPA designation.
- On May 1, 2014, a unification agreement was announced between CPA Ontario and CGA Ontario, subject to ratification by the latter's members. Contingent on such ratification, CGA Ontario members are scheduled to become associate members of CPA Ontario on July 2, 2014, and operational transitions will be complete by March 2015. Provision is made for proportionate representation from the legacy accounting bodies over a three-year period and retention of legacy designations until November 2022. Licensing of public accountants will continue to be administered by the Public Accountants Council for the Province of Ontario.
- On June 18, 2014, it was announced that the unification agreement had been approved by both sides, with effect from July 2014.
- On April 27, 2017, as part of the 2017 Ontario budget, Finance Minister Charles Sousa announced that the merger would be going ahead, and implementing legislation was introduced that day as part of the budget implementation bill. The bill received Royal Assent and came into force on May 17, 2017, with no amendments relating to the CPA amalgamation. Prior to third reading, hearings were held for one day by the Legislature's Standing Committee on Finance and Economic Affairs, at which the Institute of Management Accountants, the Association of International Certified Professional Accountants and the Association of Chartered Certified Accountants appeared to protest restrictions that effectively bar their members from identifying themselves by their professional designations in many circumstances, and one witness declared that "the suppression of international credentials is an exercise in overkill." No amendments were brought forth for discussion before the committee reported back.

Because of Ontario's licensing régime for public accountants, those holding licenses from the CPAO must identify themselves as "Licensed Public Accountants" (French: expert-comptable autorisé) or post the initials "LPA" (French: ECA) immediately after their professional designation, such as "CPA, LPA", "CPA, CA, LPA", "CPA, CGA, LPA" or "CPA, CMA, LPA".

=== Implementation in British Columbia ===
In May 2013, a merger agreement was announced with respect to all three accounting bodies in the province. Pending the necessary legislative measures to create an amalgamated body, the designation was introduced in BC after the passage of by-laws by all organizations, as ratified in the Miscellaneous Statutes Amendment Act, 2014 by the Legislative Assembly of British Columbia. The actual implementing legislation for amalgamating the three bodies received Royal Assent in March 2015, and came into force in June 2015.

=== Implementation in Nova Scotia ===
Unlike other jurisdictions, Nova Scotia decided not to amalgamate its legacy accounting bodies into the new CPA provincial body. It has instead declared that members of the legacy bodies must pair their legacy designation with the new CPA designation. In a news release (subsequently affirmed during debate on the bill's second reading), the Province noted that this was the first of two steps in the process, with merger of the three accounting bodies and updating the regulatory framework taking place at a later date. A subsequent Act was passed in December 2015 to effect the amalgamation, which came into force on August 2, 2016.

A companion Act was passed at the same time to expand the role of the Public Accountants Board of Nova Scotia, so that it can issue separate licenses for performing auditing and non-auditing functions. That Act substantially came into force on the same date, with the exception of certain provisions allowing the licensing of public accountants from outside the Province. As of September 2019, this system of parallel regulation will be abolished, and CPANS will be granted the power to issue public accounting licences.

=== Impact on the Canadian landscape ===
During the years running up to the 2012-2018 consolidation, as well as thereafter, there has been debate as to the practical impact of the merger.

The 2010-2011 CA/CMA position paper on the proposed merger gave five reasons why it should be pursued:

1. The existing regulatory framework was complex and costly.
2. The differences in the functions pursued by the various designation holders were disappearing.
3. A strong Canadian voice was needed on the world stage.
4. It was necessary to compete with other accounting designations that were going global, such as the Chartered Global Management Accountant (promoted by the American Institute of Certified Public Accountants and the Chartered Institute of Management Accountants) and CPA Australia.
5. It was desirable to act proactively, instead of waiting for reforms imposed by various governments.

There was significant resistance by the CA membership at the time, who were concerned that their collective image would be diminished as a result.

Following the consolidation, the following observations have been made:

1. Based on a social network theory analysis, it appears that those associated with the former chartered accountant bodies have generally had a disproportionate impact in the attainment of political power within the new CPA bodies, extending even to ousting the knowledge base that had been accumulated within the other legacy bodies.
2. The new CPA bodies have adopted a more passive approach in recruiting new members, in contrast to the activity undertaken by the previous legacy bodies.

== Foreign professional bodies active in Canada ==
As possession of a Canadian professional accounting designation is not generally a mandatory requirement to hold a Canadian financial position, other professional bodies have members who also work in Canada, of which the most significant are:

- Chartered Institute of Management Accountants
- Association of Chartered Certified Accountants
- Institute of Management Accountants

The provincial CPA bodies have been active in seeking to protect the designation. In October 2019, however, CPA Ontario and the Quebec Ordre failed in their oppositions filed at the Trademarks Opposition Board with respect to certain trademark applications filed by AICPA and CIMA, as the protections secured by provincial statutes were irrelevant in the face of their prior use by the foreign bodies as governed by federal law.
