= Edward Roper Curzon Clarkson =

Canadian chartered accountant, receiver, and business executive

Edward Roper Curzon (ERC) Clarkson
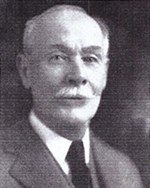
- Born: August 11, 1852; Toronto, Ontario Canada
- Died: April 5, 1931 (aged 78); Toronto, Ontario
- Resting place: Mount Pleasant Cemetery, Toronto
- Education: Upper Canada College
- Occupations: Accountant; Bankruptcy receiver & trustee
- Known for: Prominent Accountant and Bankruptcy reformer; Senior Partner of Clarkson Gordon & Co; President and founder of the Institute of Accountants of Ontario, Founder of Institute of Chartered Accountants in Canada; President of the Toronto Board of Trade (1889)
- Board member of: Toronto Board of Trade; Credit Foncier Franco-Canadien Loan Co; Consolidated Land & Investment Co; Might's Directory Company; Canada Permanent Mortgage Corporation; Manulife; Canadian Protection Fund
- Spouse: Amy Boydell Lambe (m. 1877 died 1929)
- Children: Geoffrey Teignmouth Clarkson (1878-1949); Roger (1884-1944); Edward Guy Clarkson (1888-1960); Hugh (1890-1914); Frederick Curzon (1880-1951); Lt. Maurice Arundel (1893-1917)
- Relatives: Thomas Clarkson (Upper Canada)

Edward Roper Curzon "ERC" Clarkson, (August 11, 1852 – April 4, 1931), was a Canadian accountant, insolvency receiver and reformer, and executive noted for serving as a senior partner with Clarkson Gordon & Co (eventually Ernst & Young Canada), founding the first chartered accounting institute in Canada which eventually became the Canadian Institute of Chartered Accountants, serving as the CICA's first president.

He was widely regarded in his obituaries as the first Canadian chartered accountant, and was a prominent member and president of the Toronto Board of Trade, an organisation which his father, Thomas Clarkson (Upper Canada) helped found and himself served as president through the 1850s. His son, Geoffrey Teignmouth Clarkson was noted for his specialism in banking audits and corporate rescue. Both were highly regarded within the Canadian business community.

ERC was a prominent supporter of bankruptcy, insolvency, receivership and bank auditing reform and was a pioneer in corporate rescues in Canada. He was known - according to Walter L. Gordon - as "the business doctor". ERC eventually convinced the financial institutions who sought his counsel in winding up situations to allow him to operate the failing business as a going concern through his appointment as a receiver. This was the precursor to an administrator in a trading insolvency. He advocated in several Board of Trade speeches for the reform of the Bankruptcy and Banking Acts to provide better support to banking depositors and creditors. His son's recommendations as liquidator of the Home Bank of Canada in 1923 following the collapse of the Home Bank of Canada set the groundwork for the creation of the Canada Deposit Insurance Corporation.

== Life and career ==
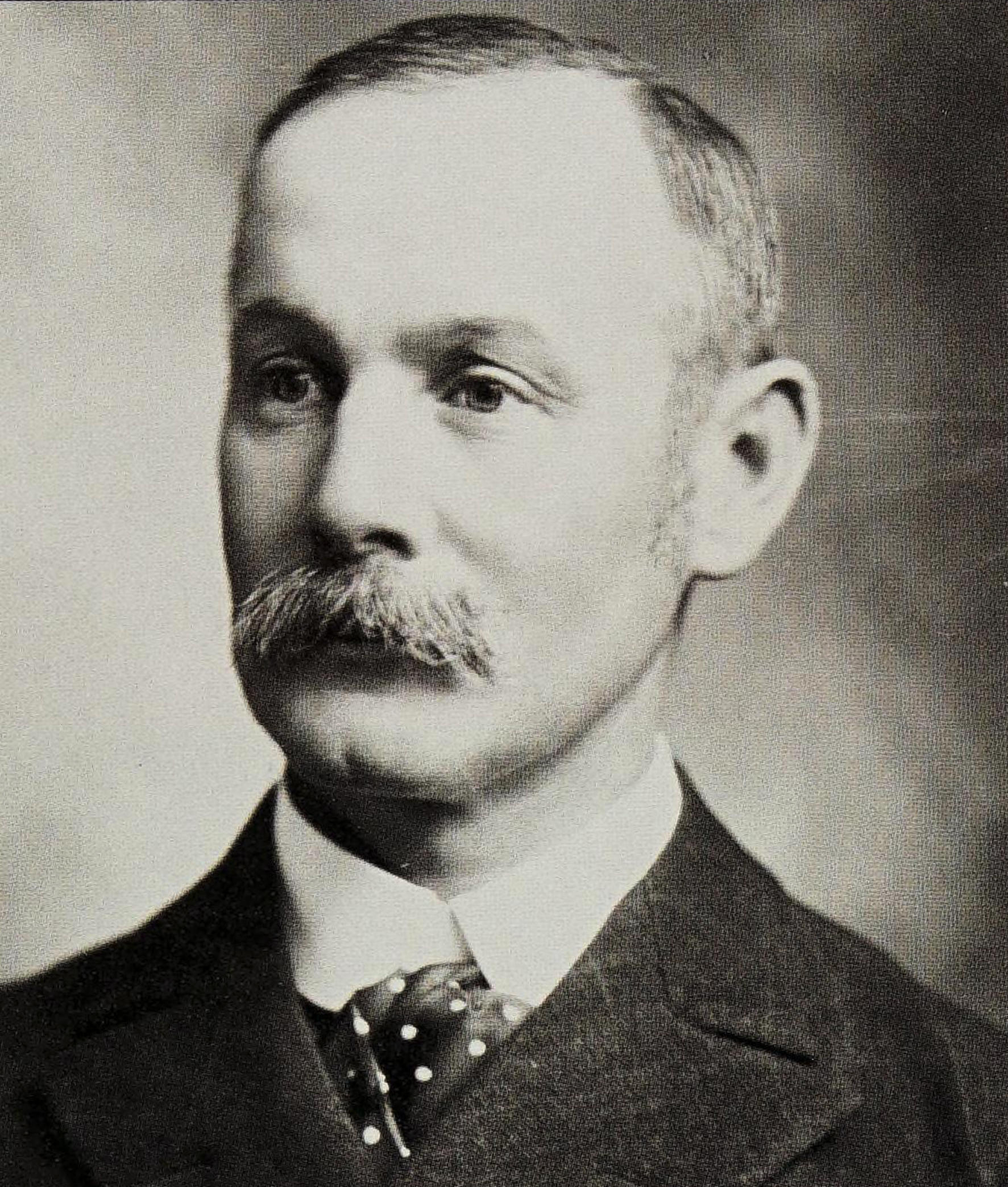
ERC Clarkson circa 1878

Born in Toronto to prominent Torontonians Thomas Clarkson and Sarah Helliwell of the Toronto Helliwells, ERC was one of 16 of his father's children and the eldest boy to his mother. He was educated at Upper Canada College from 1864 to 1867 before training with Lewis, Kay & Co, a dry goods merchant based in Montreal for £25 annually. He returned to Toronto in 1869 following his father's stroke and married Amy Boydell Lambe in 1872 in Minto, Ontario. Amy's grandmother was the niece of Alderman John Boydell and her aunt was the wife of Lord Fisher. Amy's brother, Harold Lambe, who married ERC's sister founded the Toronto Argonauts rowing club and was the football club's second coach. The Lambe family, according to Lord Fisher, had earned its reputation and money after Amy's grandfather had entertained King William IV to taste wine and received frequent royal warrants to supply wine throughout his life.

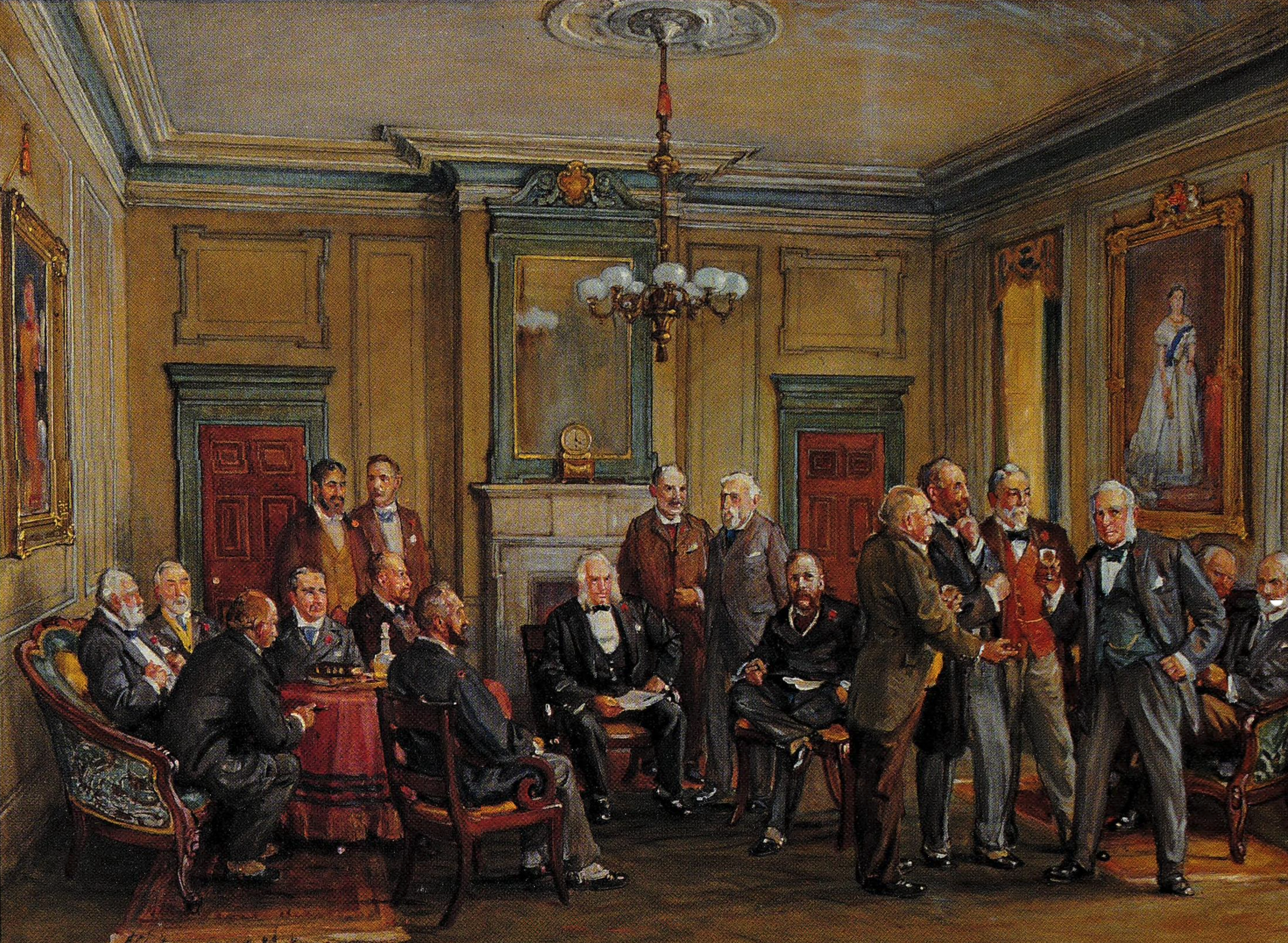
Painting by Fredrick Challener of accounting meeting in December 1882

Following his father's death in 1874, ERC took over full-time his father's receivership business. He became interested in accounting and in 1882 was a founding member the Institute of Accountants of Ontario and the Institute of Chartered Accountants in Canada. Clarkson was the only member who consistently called himself a chartered accountant and served as the Institute of Accountants of Ontario's president from 1887-1888.

ERC was, by 1898, "Charged with the management of three-fourths of the large estates wound up in the Province of Ontario for many past years. [A] life member of Ionic Lodge A.F. & A.M, a member of the Board of Directors of the Credit Foncier Franco-Canadien Loan Co, a director of the Consolidated Land & Investment Co and of Might's Directory Company." At one time, he audited five of the largest Chartered banks of Canada at the same time.

E. R. C. had a fine reputation in the business community, with his advice being particularly sought by the banks. He became known for his ability to wind up businesses quickly and realize cash for the creditors. However, he did not think this policy was good for Canada or the banks or, in fact, for any of the major creditors. He persuaded one of the banks to let him manage one of the companies which was in difficulty instead of winding it up. He was able to pull the company out of its difficulties and this was very important to the small community in which it was located, as well as continuing to be a profitable client for the bank.

In 1912, E. R. C. was elected a director of the Canada Permanent Mortgage Corporation, and in 1922, he was elected a Vice President. In 1914, he was elected a director of the Manufacturers Life Insurance Company and held these and other important positions until his death at the age of 78. E. R. C. was also President of the Toronto Board of Trade, an organization which his father (Thomas Clarkson) helped found.

ERC retired from the firm in 1913.

ERC died in 1931 from prostate cancer. William Herbert Price, Ontario Attorney-General described him as “the first chartered accountant in Canada, I believe, and his organisation is the monument to his ability and integrity."

For his services to the accounting industry, ERC was elected to the Canadian Academic Accounting Association inaugural hall of fame inductees as a "Founder of the profession".

== Personal life and philanthropy ==
By the 1890s the Clarkson family had acquired substantial land on Toronto Island alongside ERC's schoolboy friends George Horace Gooderham and Aemilius Jarvis. ERC served as the Royal Canadian Yacht Club Commodore in 1899 and his son, Geoffrey Teignmouth Clarkson owned and sailed the winning boat in the Club's annual Regatta, even winning the 1893 Regatta in a tie. A staunch advocate for education, ERC was the auditor of the University of Toronto from 1881 to his death in 1931, a service he provided free of charge. His son, following his lead, sat on the board as Chairman of Havergal College, was governor of Upper Canada College from 1920 to 1949 and was vice-chairman of Wycliffe College as well as sitting on the boards of University of Toronto and the Toronto Hospital for Sick Children. ERC was on board of the Toronto Bureau of Municipal Research as one of two Trustees. He audited the Canadian Bankers’ Association books without remuneration, a practice his son continued.

ERC was a heavy supporter of education and frequently funded the University of Toronto, provided temporary land in 1903 to Ridley College in the old Stephenson House in St. Catherines, and donated to the Royal Ontario Museum of Zoology two blue geese which had been shot and preserved by his son in 1922.

Of his sons, two saw combat during the first world war: Maurice Arundel a sporting star who had played for the Toronto Argonauts and a lieutenant who was killed in Vimmy Ridge in April 1917, and Edward Guy who was awarded the Military Cross at Passchendaele. Through the war, ERC served on the executive committee of the Canadian Patriotic Fund from 1918 alongside friend William Mulock and The Marquess of Willingdon, the Vere Ponsonby, 9th Earl of Bessborough, and Lord Byng of Vimy.
