= Thomas Clarkson (Upper Canada) =

English-Canadian merchant in Upper Canada

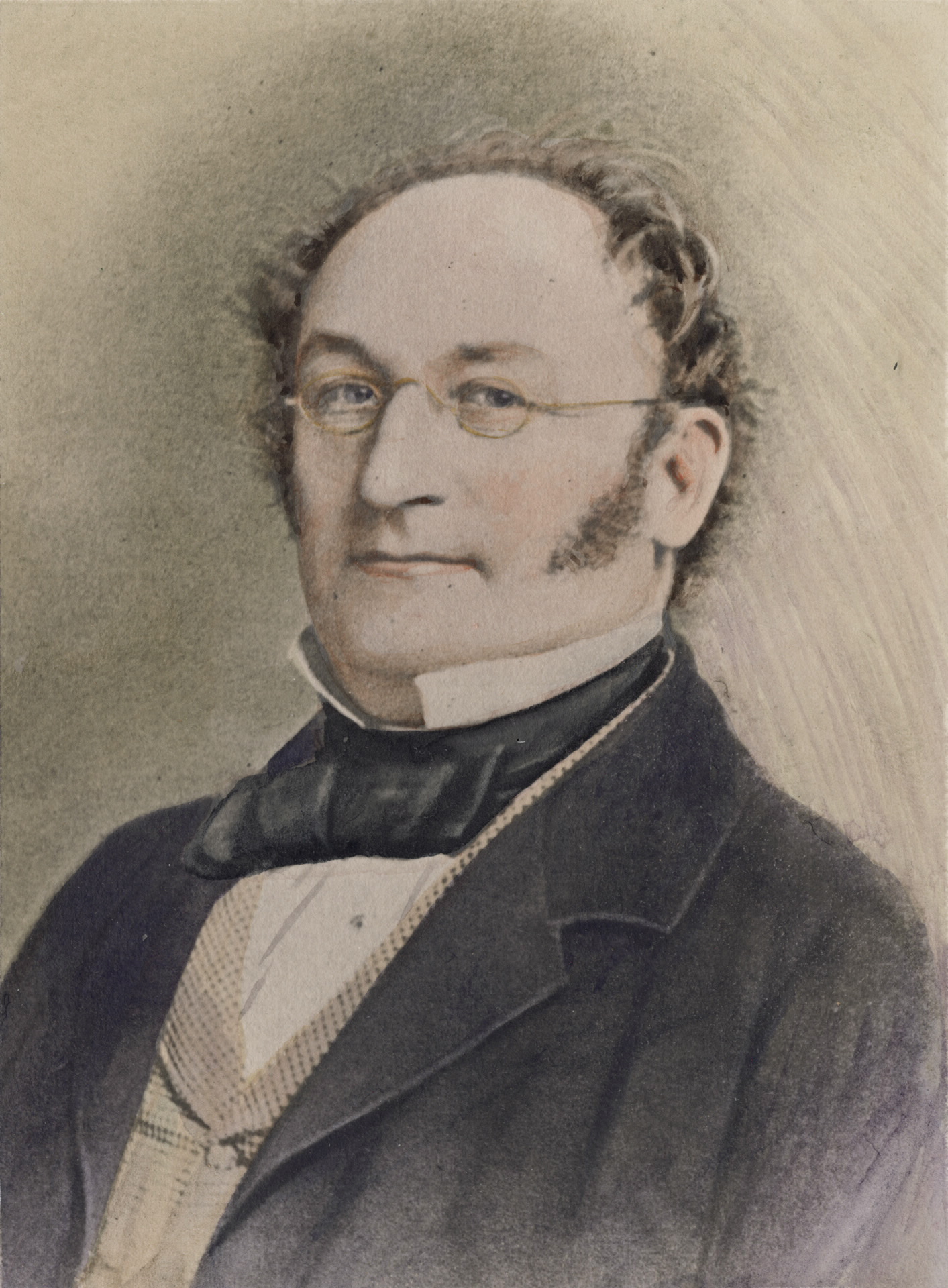
- Born: January 26, 1802; Susworth, parish of Scotter, Lincolnshire, England
- Died: May 4, 1874 (aged 72); Toronto, Ontario
- Resting place: St. James Cemetery (Toronto)
- Occupations: Accountant; Bankruptcy receiver & trustee; Merchant; Director of Bank of Toronto
- Known for: Founder Clarkson Gordon & Co; Director of Bank of Toronto; incorporator and president of the Toronto Board of Trade 1852-189; Founder and president of the Commercial Building and Investment Society; President of the Toronto Annexation Association 1849
- Board member of: Toronto Board of Trade; Bank of Toronto; Commercial Building and Investment Society
- Spouses: Elizabeth Farnham (d. 1829) 1821-1829; Carrie Brunskill m. 1834; Sarah Helliwell (d. 1878) m. 1844-1874
- Children: 16

Thomas Clarkson, (c. January 26, 1802 – May 4, 1874), was an English Canadian merchant, banker, businessman, receiver, director, and associated with the Family Compact, although was noted for his desire to increase free trade relations with the United States whom he described as "Canada's most important traders and partners", even advocating for an ambassador be sent to D.C. to exert "some active, intelligent, and influential representation of the commercial interests of Canada near the controlling power of the United States" and reciprocity with the British West India Island. He established, in 1864, the trustee and receivership business which would eventually become Clarkson Gordon. He was a founder, incorporator and first president of the Toronto Board of Trade, president of the Commercial Building and Investment Society, commissioner of the Port of Toronto, director (alongside William Molson, John A. Macdonald, and James Morton) of the Beacon Fire and Life Insurance Co. of London, the Toronto for Unity Fire Association (of London) with Allan MacNab, Federick Jarvis, and Benjamin Cronyn, and the Bank of Toronto, the former of which he served as vice president in its inaugural year in 1859.

Thomas was a highly prominent early Toronto financier, described in a local paper following a June 1858 presentation of Handel's oratorio of Judas Maccabaeus in St Lawrence Hall, "as one of the distinguished patrons, which included such notables as Sir John Beverley Robinson and John A. Macdonald"

== Life and career ==
Thomas was born in Scotter, Lincolnshire in 1802 to Anglican parents, he emigrated to York, Upper Canada in 1832 aboard the packet ship the New York. He began specialising in goods on commission, specifically grain and merchant financing. In 1842, the business purchased 2,082 gallons of whiskey from Gooderham and Worts. Gooderham's own son George Horace Gooderham was schoolboy friends with Thomas', Edward Roper Curzon Clarkson, and alongside Aemilius Jarvis the three were sailors and members of Royal Canadian Yacht Club on Toronto Island. Thomas' sons had strong ties to the Gooderham and Jarvis' and had substantial land holdings on Toronto Island.

His first partnerships in Toronto was with Thomas Brunskill of Thornhill in 1845. By the latter half of the 1840s, Clarkson participated in several financial ventures in Upper Canada. His political advocacy was highly varied. Clarkson unsuccessfully ran for political office against James Hervey Price in October 1844 for the first riding of York. He was heavily favourited. The Montreal Gazette reported that “Mr. Clarkson, merchant, will most likely oppose him. Mr. C. Is well known in the riding, and the probability is that he will respond to the call of the electors”. Despite being thought of as a conservative and thought of as a member of the Family Compact, he was also a member of the Toronto Annexation Association. He served as president of that association in the 1840s.

During that same era, he increasingly became interested in the newly formed Toronto Exchange. He was one of the original founders of the incorporated Toronto Board of Trade, serving as president from 1852 to 1859. While the Board of Trade had existed since at least 1830, its incorporation under Upper Canada legislation was a watershed to its legitimacy. On his retirement from this post, he expressed caution about the problems of trade in Canada under current policies.

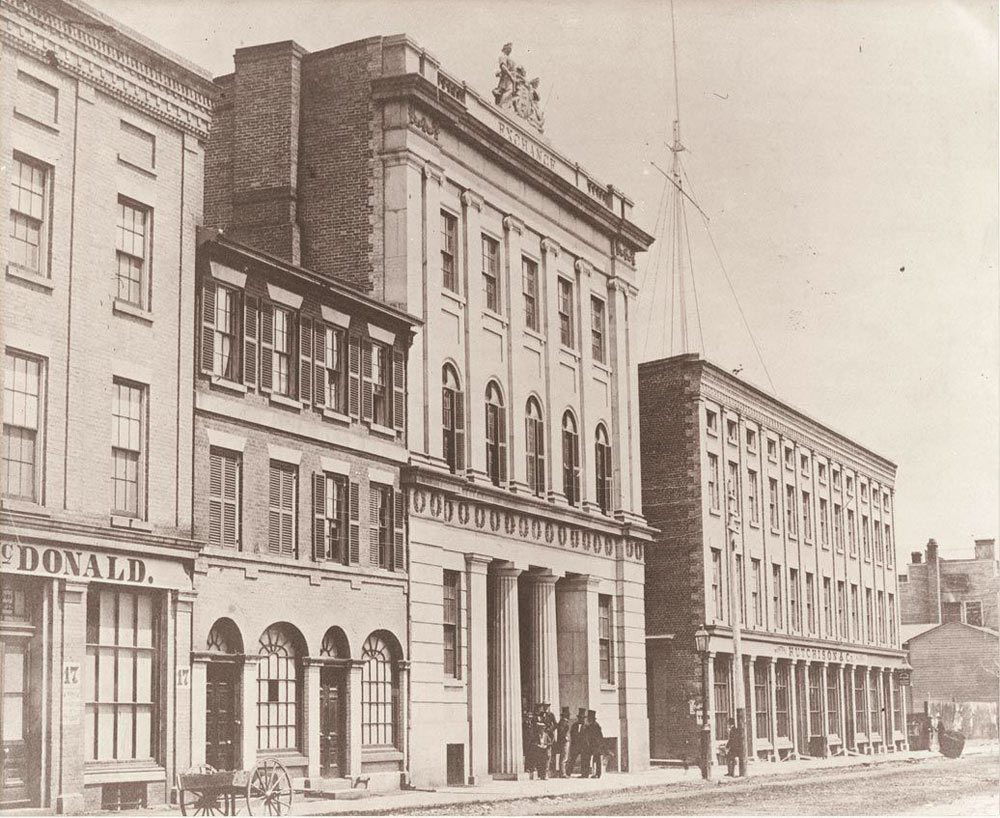
The Exchange Building, raised by Clarkson during his term as president of the Toronto board of trade

Thomas supported reducing tariffs on trade and campaigned hard for reduced legislation on trade restriction laws, tariffs, and anti-immigration. Alongside other grain merchants, he supported the establishment of, and played a critical role in, the formation of the Bank of Toronto. Indicative of that involvement, he served as an inaugural director from 1856 to 1858. In that same year, he constructed Thomas Clarkson House, still located at 83 Front Street, Toronto.

The economic depression following 1857 saw some of his ventures fail, notably the Toronto and Georgian Bay Canal Company, a venture in which he appeared at the head of the list of incorporators of the company a year earlier and chaired investor meetings in 1854.

=== Work in Milwaukee ===
Thomas then moved to Milwaukee, Wisconsin, where economic growth proved better prospects. Alongside his sons Benjamin Reid and Robert Guy, Thomas established T Clarkson and Sons, a grain and produce commission business which Robert Guy continued to operate upon Thomas' return to Canada in 1864.

=== Return to Canada ===
In 1864, with economic prospects in Milwaukee worsening, Thomas became an assignee in bankruptcy for the province and contributed substantially toward early accounting practices in Canada. This company, Clarkson, Hunter and Company, became the foundation for the accounting firm Clarkson Gordon & Co. By 1872, Thomas had suffered a paralytic stroke and was unable to continue operating the grain storage elevator he had purchased in 1869, his work with the Produce Merchants Exchange, nor his assignee business.

== Death and legacy ==
Clarkson died in Toronto in 1874 soon after suffering a stroke in 1872. His son, Edward Roper Curzon Clarkson, would grow Thomas’ trustee and receivership business into Clarkson Gordon to one of the largest accounting firms in Canada until its merger with Ernst & Young in the 1980s. ERC was a pioneer corporate rescues in Canada, eventually convincing the financial institutions who sought his counsel in winding-up to allow him to operate the business as a going concern. ERC was, by 1898, "Charged with the management of three-fourths of the large estates wound up in the Province of Ontario for many past years. [A] life member of Ionic Lodge A.F. & A.M, a member of the Board of Directors of the Credit Foncier Franco-Canadien Loan Co, a director of the Consolidated Land & Investment Co and of Might's Directory Company."

== Family and personal life ==
In all, Thomas married three wives and had twenty-one children. Only 16 survived childhood.

Much of Thomas' life is marked by tragedy. Two of his wives died in childbirth. His first son died in 1823 during child birth. Upon remarrying two of his youngest children died of scarlet fever in February 1844. His wife had died less than a year before. In 1852, less than a month after the birth of his first son with his new wife, his eldest son from the previous marriage, Henry James, drown after the carriage carrying all of his children careened into the Don River.
