= Ronald Osborne =

English-born Canadian executive (1946–2013)

- Born: Ronald Walter Osborne; 11 May 1946; Ashington, West Sussex, U.K.
- Died: 9 April 2013 (aged 66); Golf, Florida, U.S.
- Resting place: Mount Pleasant Cemetery, Toronto
- Education: Cambridge University (BA 1968)
- Spouse: Grace Snead (m. 1969)

Ronald Walter Osborne (11 May 1946 – 9 April 2013) was a British-Canadian executive who was involved mainly with media organizations.

== Life and career ==
Ronald Osborne was born in Ashington, Sussex, England, and graduated from Cambridge University in 1968, majoring in modern languages.

Osborne worked initially an accountant in his early career, after qualifying as a chartered accountant in 1972. Osborne left Britain to work for Clarkson Gordon & Co in Toronto, Canada, and later in Rio de Janeiro, Brazil, in 1976.

From 1981 to 1994, he was with Maclean Hunter, becoming the head of the media company in 1986. Osborne left after Rogers Communications acquired Maclean Hunter. In 1995, Osborne went to BCE Inc as COO and then was with Bell Canada, serving as president and CEO.

In 1997, he left the private sector to join Ontario Hydro and later was president and CEO of Ontario Power Generation after the breakup of Ontario Hydro.

In his later years, Osborne was with Postmedia as chair in 2010 and was director of various other companies.

Osborne died in his home in Florida, U.S., at the age of 66 and he was buried in Mount Pleasant Cemetery in Toronto, Canada.
