= George Percival Ridout =

George Percival Ridout (August 21, 1807 – June 28, 1873) was an English-born merchant and politician in Canada West. He represented Toronto in the Legislative Assembly of the Province of Canada from 1851 to 1854 as an independent Conservative.

George Ridout built a mansion in Dorset Street in Toronto that quickly became a landmark because of its spacious rooms and extensive out buildings. He lived in the property for ten years before moving. After unsuccessfully being converted into a hotel the house fell into disrepair and became known as a bad place in Toronto. After many issues, including the death of a child in the home, the mansion was torn down in 1887.

He was born in Bristol, the son of George Ridout and Mary Ann Wright, and came to Philadelphia with his parents in 1820. With his brother Joseph Davis, Ridout was employed with English iron and hardware merchants Tarratt's. In 1828, he moved to York where he entered the study of law. In 1832, Ridout formed Ridout Brothers and Company, a company dealing in wholesale and retail sales of iron and hardware, with his brother. From 1844 to 1852, he served as president of the Toronto Board of Trade. In 1851, he was elected to Toronto city council and the Toronto public school board of trustees. Ridout also ran unsuccessfully for mayor in 1851. He was defeated when he ran for reelection to the provincial assembly in 1854. Ridout retired from the hardware business in 1866. He became governor for the British America Assurance Company in 1853 and became manager for the same company in 1871, serving until his death in Toronto at the age of 65.
