= Aemilius Jarvis =

Canadian financier, equestrian, and sailor

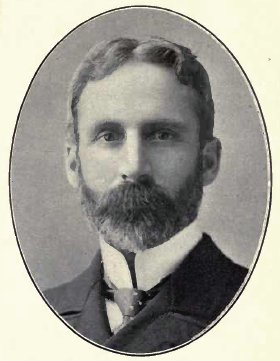
- Born: Edward Aemilius Jarvis; April 25, 1860; Bonshaw, York County, Canada West
- Died: December 19, 1940 (aged 80); Toronto, Ontario, Canada
- Occupations: Businessman, equestrian, sailor

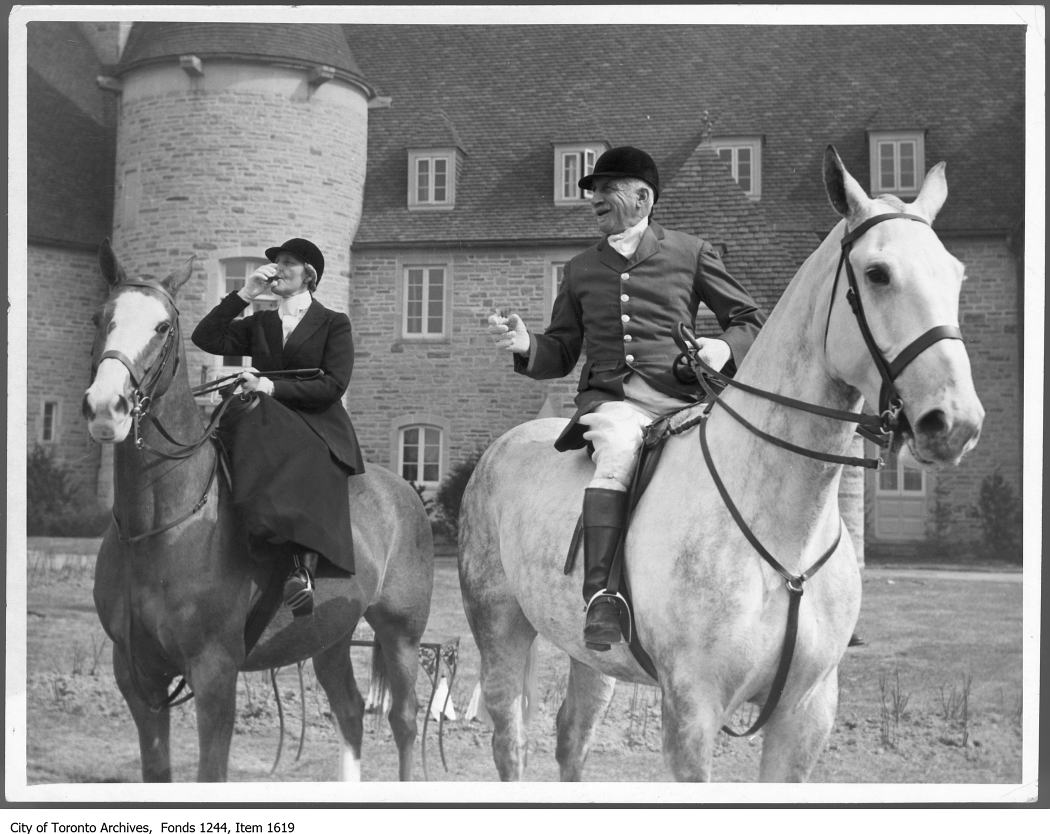
Lady Eaton and Aemilius Jarvis at Eaton Hall in King City, Ontario, during the mid-1930s.

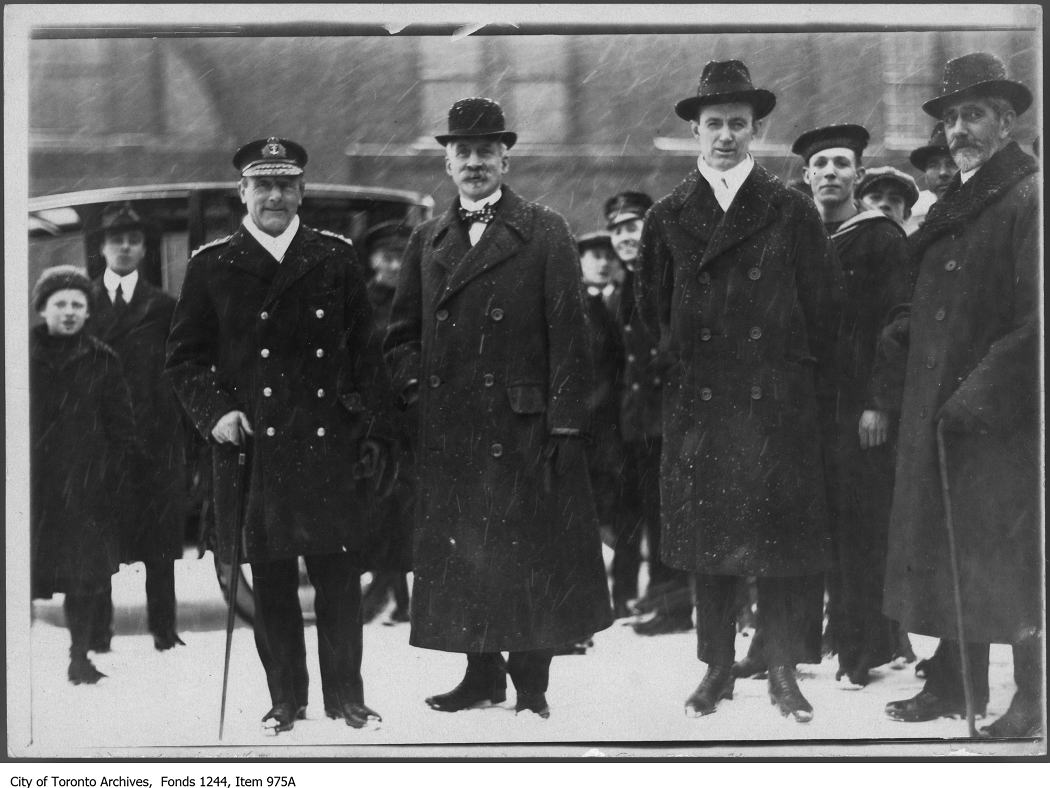
Admiral Jellicoe, head of the Navy, Aemilius Jarvis, and Mayor Tommy Church in Toronto – Jellicoe is on the left, Jarvis in the centre, and Church to the right of Jarvis (1918/19)

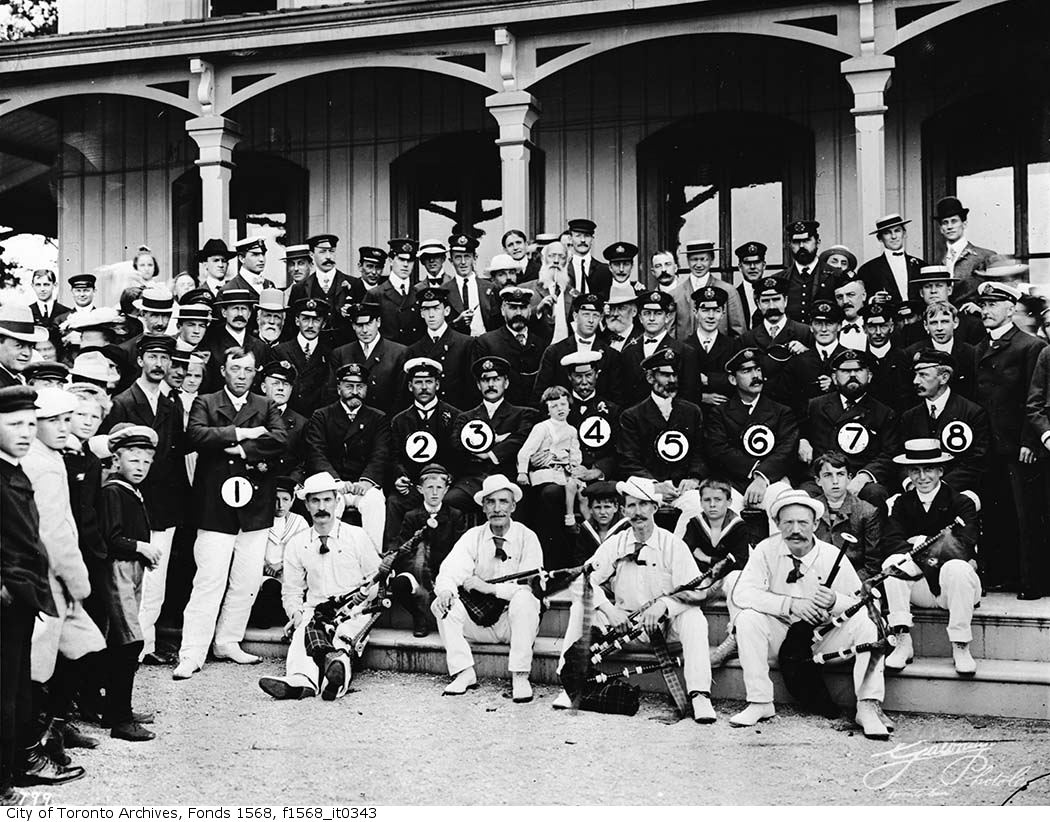
Sir Thomas Lipton (4) at the Royal Canadian Yacht Club, Toronto Island 1903 - Commodore Aemilius Jarvis (5), Vice-Commodore Stephen S. Haas (3), and Rear-Commodore George H. Gooderham (6).

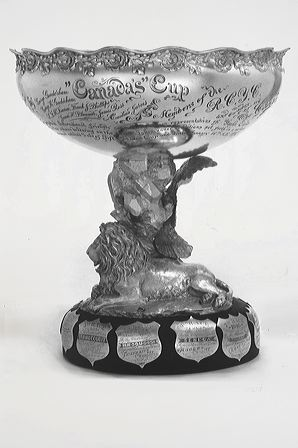
The Canada's Cup is a perpetual trophy awarded to the winner of a sailing match race between a yacht representing a Canadian yacht club and a yacht representing an American yacht club. Aemilius Jarvis sailed for the cup five times, winning the inaugural series in 1896, and repeating in 1901.

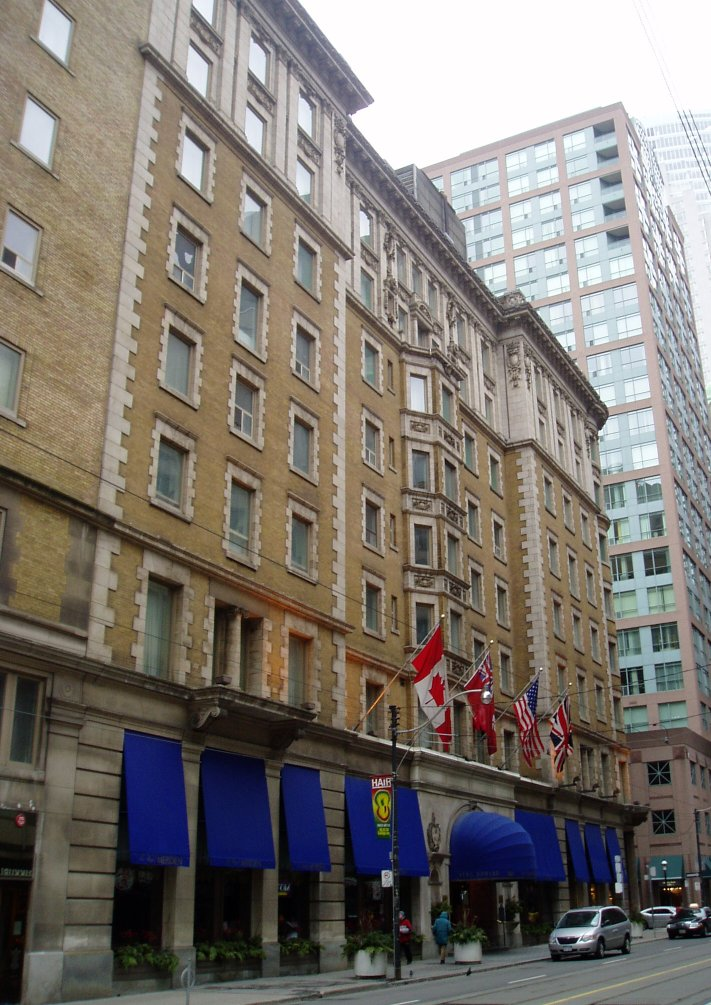
In 1899 the Toronto Hotel Company was founded by Amelia's Jarvis – with the support of George Cox (of Canada Life and the Bank of Commerce) and George Gooderham (of Gooderham & Worts Distillery). Jarvis and his Toronto Hotel Co. built the King Eddy, and it opened in 1903.

Edward Aemilius Jarvis (April 25, 1860 – December 19, 1940) was a Canadian financier, equestrian, and sailor. Jarvis was instrumental in forming the Royal Canadian Navy during World War I, recruiting both ships and men. Jarvis was notable in Toronto business circles and helped build the King Edward Hotel and Arena Gardens. He was convicted of conspiracy in the Ontario Bond Scandal of 1922, and never cleared of the conviction although his pardon was petitioned several times. He was fined CA$600,000 (equivalent to $10,946,667 in 2025) and served several months in jail. He remained a prominent figure in Toronto sailing and business circles until his death in 1940.

== Life and career ==
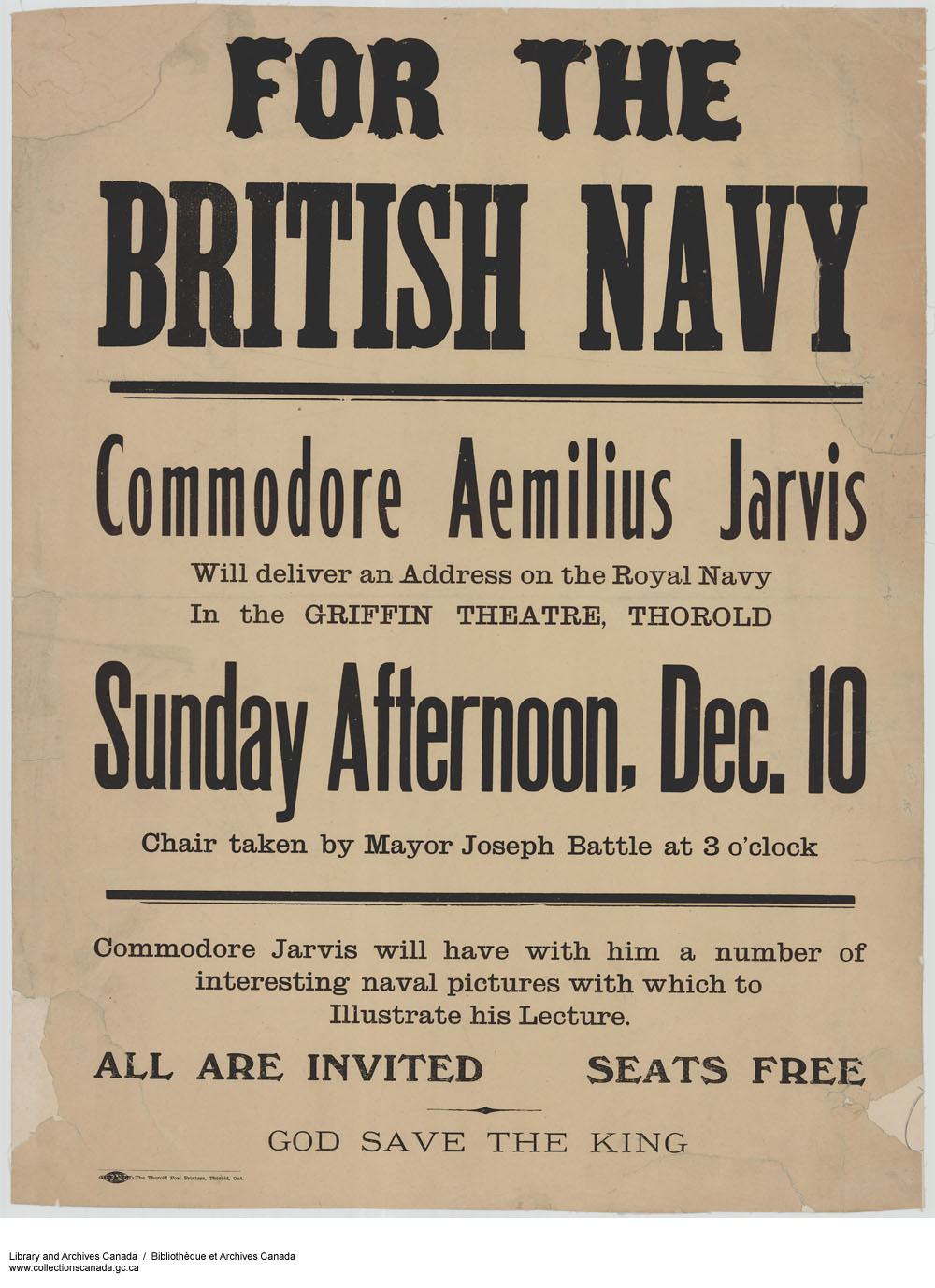
Commodore Aemilius Jarvis at the Griffin Theatre, Thorold; recruiting for the Royal Navy.

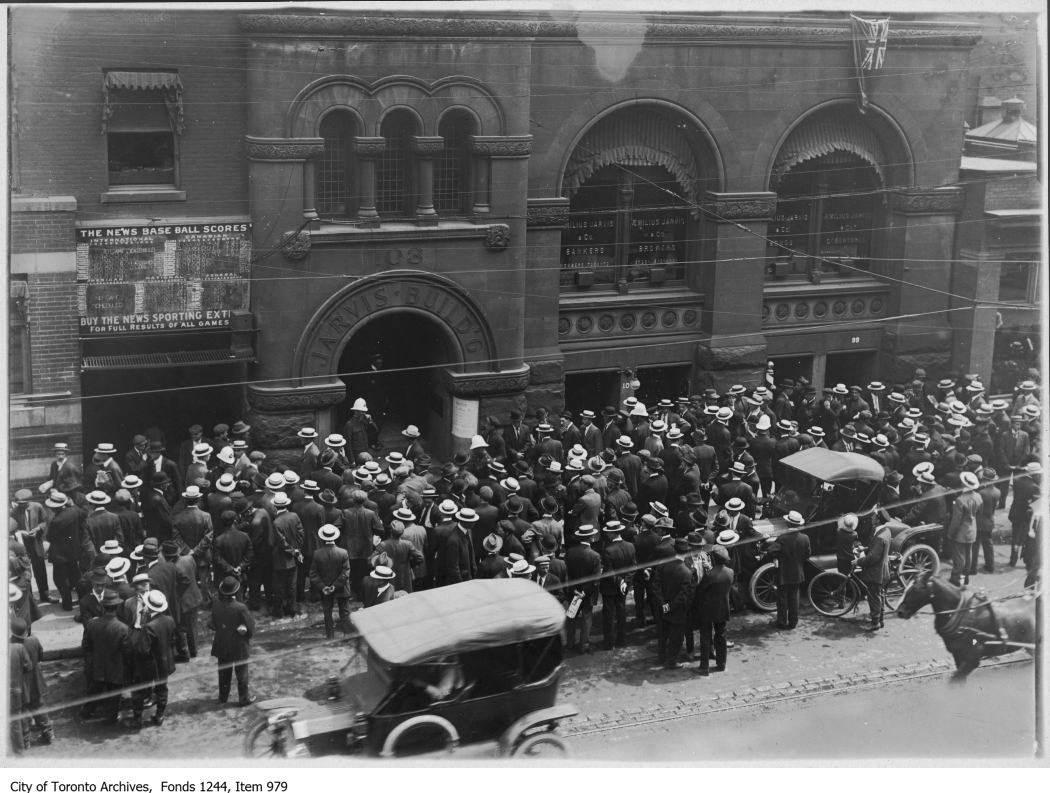
Aemilius Jarvis recruited ships (including anti-submarine vessels) and over 2000 men for Canada's World War I effort. In the first year of the war, he established a naval recruitment centre in his Toronto office.

Jarvis was born on April 25, 1860, in rural York County north of Toronto, to William Dummer Powell Jarvis, a lawyer, and Diana Irving Jarvis, a family of Loyalist descent and associated with the Family Compact of Upper Canada. Jarvis' grandfather was Samuel Peters Jarvis and his great-grandfather was William Jarvis. In 1860, the family moved to Hamilton, Ontario to be closer to his mother's family, the Irvings. Jarvis attended Upper Canada College, leaving at age 16 in 1876. In 1884, Jarvis married his first cousin Augustus Irving, who died after World War I. He later married Marion Gertrude Read in 1929. He fathered three daughters and three sons, one of whom, Bill was killed in World War I.

Beginning in 1878, Jarvis apprenticed as a banker at the Bank of Hamilton, and eventually became president of the Trader's Bank of Canada in Toronto. Jarvis formed Æmilius Jarvis & Co. financial company, which figured in the later bond scandal. In his role as financier, Jarvis helped found the Hamilton Iron and Steel Company, later known as Stelco. He helped create the British Columbia salmon canning industry through the companies that still market Clover Leaf sea food products today. In 1899, the Toronto Hotel Company was founded by Jarvis, with the support of George Cox (of Canada Life and the Bank of Commerce) and George Gooderham (of Gooderham & Worts Distillery). The Toronto Hotel Co. built the King Edward "King Eddy" hotel, which opened in 1903. He also operated a stud farm -called Hazelburn- in Aurora, Ontario, breeding hunter-jumper horses.

Jarvis actively supported the Royal Canadian Navy during World War I, recruiting anti-submarine and other ships, and over 2000 men. He acted as an unofficial spy for King George V while visiting Russia on business in 1915, delivering a message to George's cousin Tzar Nicholas via an intermediary to encourage Russia to stay in the war, in order to maintain two fronts on Germany. (The intermediary was shortly thereafter assassinated on a train platform immediately following passing -and ignoring- Jarvis in a train-car corridor, with several "ugly" men following close behind her.) Aemilius was recognized by the Navy League of Canada's award of its unofficial “Special Service Decoration” for his wartime contributions.

Jarvis earned the friendship and respect of such men as Lord Minto (Governor General of Canada), J.P. Morgan, Sir Thomas Lipton, Lord Beaverbrook, Sir Henry Pellatt, Edward Roper Curzon Clarkson and world-champion rower Ned Hanlan. Jarvis died at age 80 in Toronto General Hospital on December 19, 1940, after a long illness. His funeral in Toronto's St. James Cathedral was largely attended and included many notables of the day including Canada's Ministry of the Interior Clifford Sifton. Jarvis' grandson Robert Aemilius Jarvis published a biography of his grandfather, "The Last Viking".

== Legendary yachtsman ==
Jarvis sailed alone around Lake Ontario, from Hamilton to Niagara-on-the-Lake to Whitby and back, in a tiny dinghy aptly called Tar Pot when he was just twelve years old. Later in life, he spent two years sailing the world in a square-rigger sailing vessel. He designed and built racing sailboats, founded the Royal Hamilton Yacht Club (RHYC), and was a longtime member of the Royal Canadian Yacht Club (RCYC), of which he was elected commodore seven times. He won the inaugural Canada's Cup yachting race in 1896 sailing the Canada, a 57-foot cutter. Additionally, he won over 100 international freshwater sailing events while at Royal Canadian Yacht Club (& more than 300 overall), including a second Canada's Cup in 1901.

Aemilius skippered in every Canada's Cup from 1896 to 1907 with the sole exception of the 1905 edition; Cup Defenders Rochester Yacht Club made it a stipulation that Jarvis not skipper in order to accept R.C.Y.C.'s challenge. R.C.Y.C.'s Temeraire ultimately lost the 30-foot class match-series to Rochester's Iroquois. He published an account of sailing his yacht, Haswell, from Toronto to the Caribbean in the winter of 1920-21 entitled, 5,000 Miles in a 27-Tonner. Jarvis was inducted into RHYC's Hall of Fame in 2015.

== Ontario bond scandal ==
Jarvis and Co. purchased CA$18 million in war bonds, at a time "when Canada's banks couldn't possibly take them", saving the government CA$4.5 million. Some of the commission on the sale went to the Government of Ontario's Treasurer Peter Smith. For this, Jarvis and Smith, along with Jarvis' son Aemilius Jr. and Harry Pepall, manager of Jarvis and Co. were arrested on May 13, 1924, on the charges of conspiracy to defraud the Government of Ontario and theft.

Jarvis was convicted on the charge of conspiracy, but acquitted of the charge of theft, and Jarvis and Co. was dissolved. Although he was jailed for six months, for the remainder of his life he defended his innocence. He'd refused, against all advice, to testify in his own defence, and one theory as to why is that he was shielding/taking a fall for his son, also charged in the affair, after having lost another son previously in World War I. His business peers signed a petition detailing the reasoned argument for Jarvis' innocence, which was proven when he took the stand in the trial of another charged in the affair. His testimony technically cleared him of the conspiracy, but this was not acknowledged by the Ontario Government. Jarvis paid a total of CA$200,000 and left jail in April 1925. The case was brought to appeals court in 1927, but dismissed.

The former Premier of Ontario, Ernest C. Drury (United Farmers of Ontario party), labelled him "Canada's Dreyfus," a reference to Alfred Dreyfus who was wrongfully charged and jailed in his native France (around the turn of the century) for blatantly political reasons and the Government of Canada would later be petitioned to pardon Jarvis.

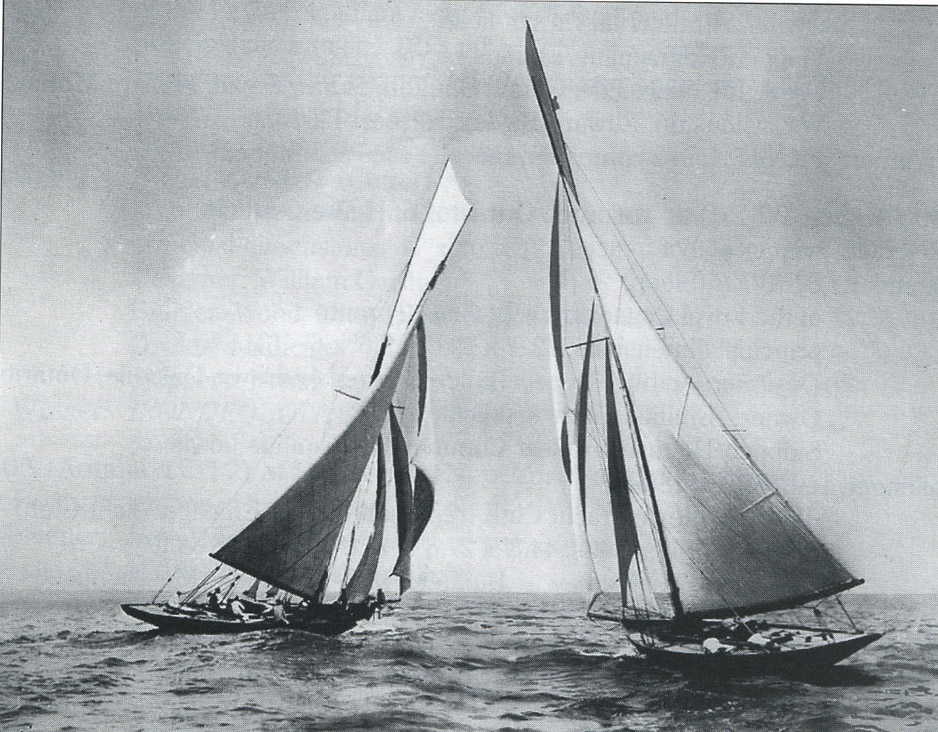
The yacht Canada (left), skippered by 'Skippadore' Aemilius Jarvis, crosses tacks with Vencedor on Lake Erie, near Toledo, Ohio, in the inaugural 1896 Canada's Cup match-racing series from which Canada emerged victor.

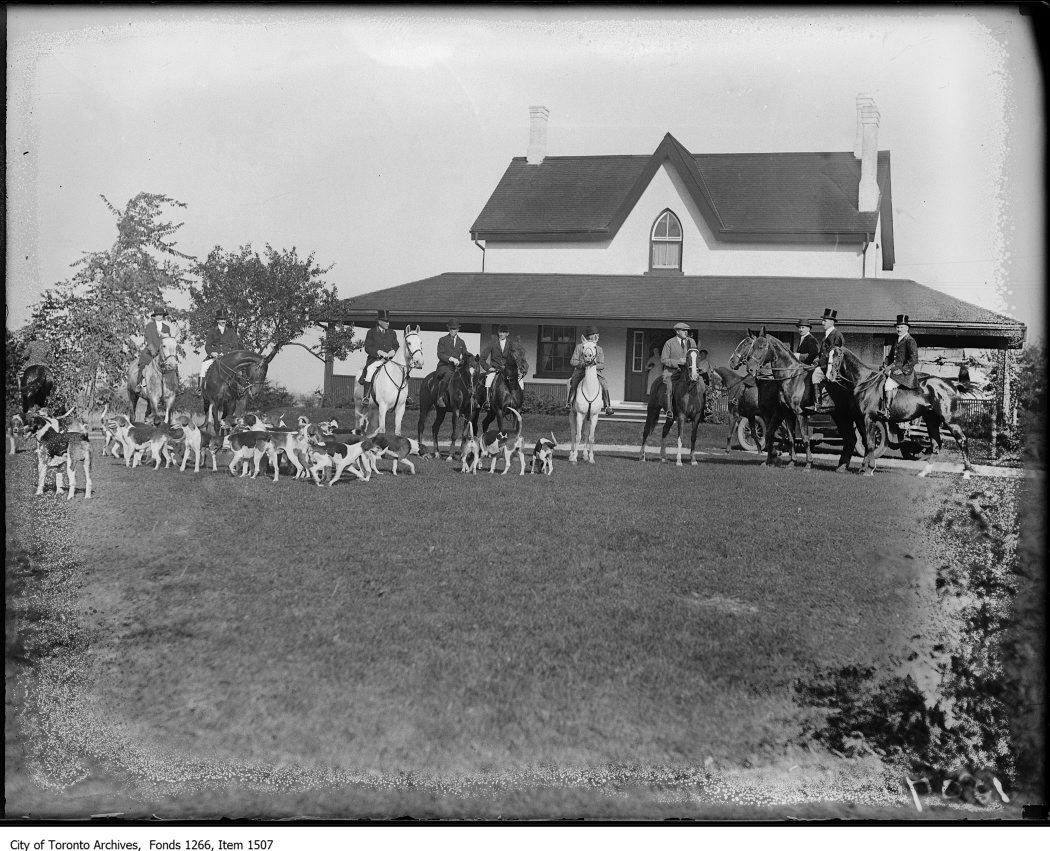
The photograph includes a view of the Aurora, ON farmhouse called Hazelburn that was owned by Aemilius Jarvis. Jarvis is on the third horse from the left.

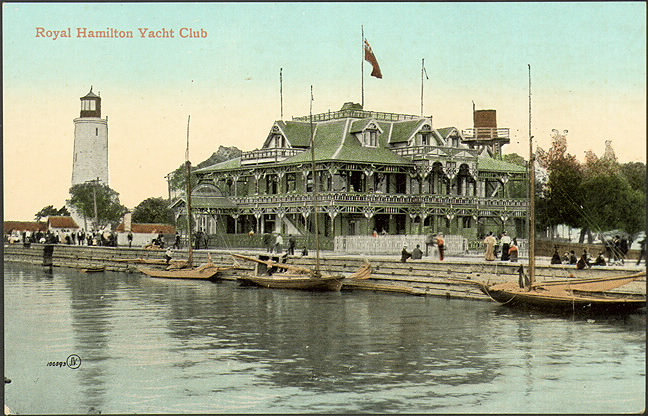
Aemilius Jarvis organized the establishment of the Hamilton Yacht Club in 1888.
