= Toronto Region Board of Trade =

Local business organisation in Canada

The Toronto Region Board of Trade is the principal local business community organization in the City of Toronto. It is the largest Chamber of Commerce/board of trade in Canada and one of the largest in North America. Its primary contemporary focus is to advocate for policy change that drives the growth and competitiveness of the Toronto region on members' behalf. Its stated objective is to make the Toronto region one of the most competitive and sought-after business regions in the world. It offers business services, educational programing, facilities, and events to its members, and policy advices and analysis to the governments of the City of Toronto, the Province of Ontario, and Canada, and various public organizations and agencies. It develops and promotes policies and programs under the key strategic pillars of trade, transportation and talent. It operates at its office in First Canadian Place in Toronto's financial district.

Toronto Region Board of Trade owns the Toronto franchise of World Trade Centre, and operates World Trade Centre Toronto (WTC-T) as its trade services division. World Trade Centre Toronto is a member of the World Trade Centers Association, a not-for-profit global association for international trade expansion.

== History ==
The Board was founded 10 February 1845 by an act of the legislature of Canada:

To promote and/or support such measures as, upon due consideration, are deemed calculated to advance and render prosperous the lawful trade and commerce and to foster the economic and social welfare of the City of Toronto... To advance in all lawful ways the commercial interests of the members of the Corporation generally and to secure the advantages to be obtained by mutual co-operation. ...each and every person carrying on trade and commerce of any kind, or being a Cashier, Manager or Director of any Financial Institution, Railway or Insurance Company, shall be eligible to become a member of the said Corporation.

Its first president was George Percival Ridout, who served in that position until 1852 when he was elected to the legislature. Following Ridout, Thomas Clarkson, also a founding member and founder of Clarkson Gordon & Co served as president until 1854. It grew slowly, and had only acquired 60 members by 1856. Until the 1860s, most members were traders, specifically wholesalers.

In 1884, it was amalgamated with the Toronto Corn Exchange Association. The Old Toronto Board of Trade Building (1892–1958), which housed the board, was Toronto's first skyscraper at seven storeys.

In 1932−33, the board's name was officially changed to "The Board of Trade of Metropolitan Toronto".

On June 17, 1973, its members voted to admit women to full membership.

In January 2013, under the leadership of then president Carol Wilding, it changed its name to its current name in an effort to reflect the interconnectedness of the Greater Toronto Area business community and to recognizes that the organization's “membership is not bound by geography.” The move was initially controversial, as the organization proceeded with the change with no consultation and limited advance notice to its sister organizations within the region. Its two largest sister organizations, the Mississauga Board of Trade and the Brampton Board of Trade, accused the organization of misrepresenting its scope in a "blatant attempt to steal members". The controversy subsided after current president Jan De Silva created, with her counterparts in sister organizations in the region, the Canada Innovation Corridor Business Council as a forum for collaboration and cooperation.

== Political Lobbying ==
In 2017, the organization started campaigning to shift ownership of municipally owned transit agencies in Toronto.
