= Home Bank of Canada =

Canadian bank (1903–1923)

- Industry: Bank
- Predecessor: Toronto Savings Bank/Home Savings and Loan (1854-1903)
- Founded: July 10, 1903
- Defunct: August 18, 1923
- Headquarters: Toronto, Ontario, Canada

The Home Bank of Canada was a Canadian bank that experienced meteoric growth from its start in 1903 to its sensational and costly collapse in 1923. Its collapse shattered public trust in banks and encouraged growth in bank reform sentiment among the powerful farmer organizations of the time.

It was incorporated July 10, 1903, in Toronto but did not receive a Treasury Board certificate to operate as a chartered bank until the next year.

It succeeded the earlier Toronto Savings Bank, which had been founded in 1854 by Bishop Armand-François-Marie de Charbonnel and the local chapter of the Society of St. Vincent de Paul and later Home Savings and Loans in 1871. The failure of Home Bank on August 18, 1923, was the subject of a Canadian Royal Commission initiated by Prime Minister William Lyon Mackenzie King in 1924.

Founded with the support of the Roman Catholic Church, James Mason and Henry Pellatt represented a benign board of directors including E.G. Gooderham, Claude Macdonnell and three other directors from Winnipeg, Manitoba, affiliated with the United Grain Growers.

== Early controversies ==
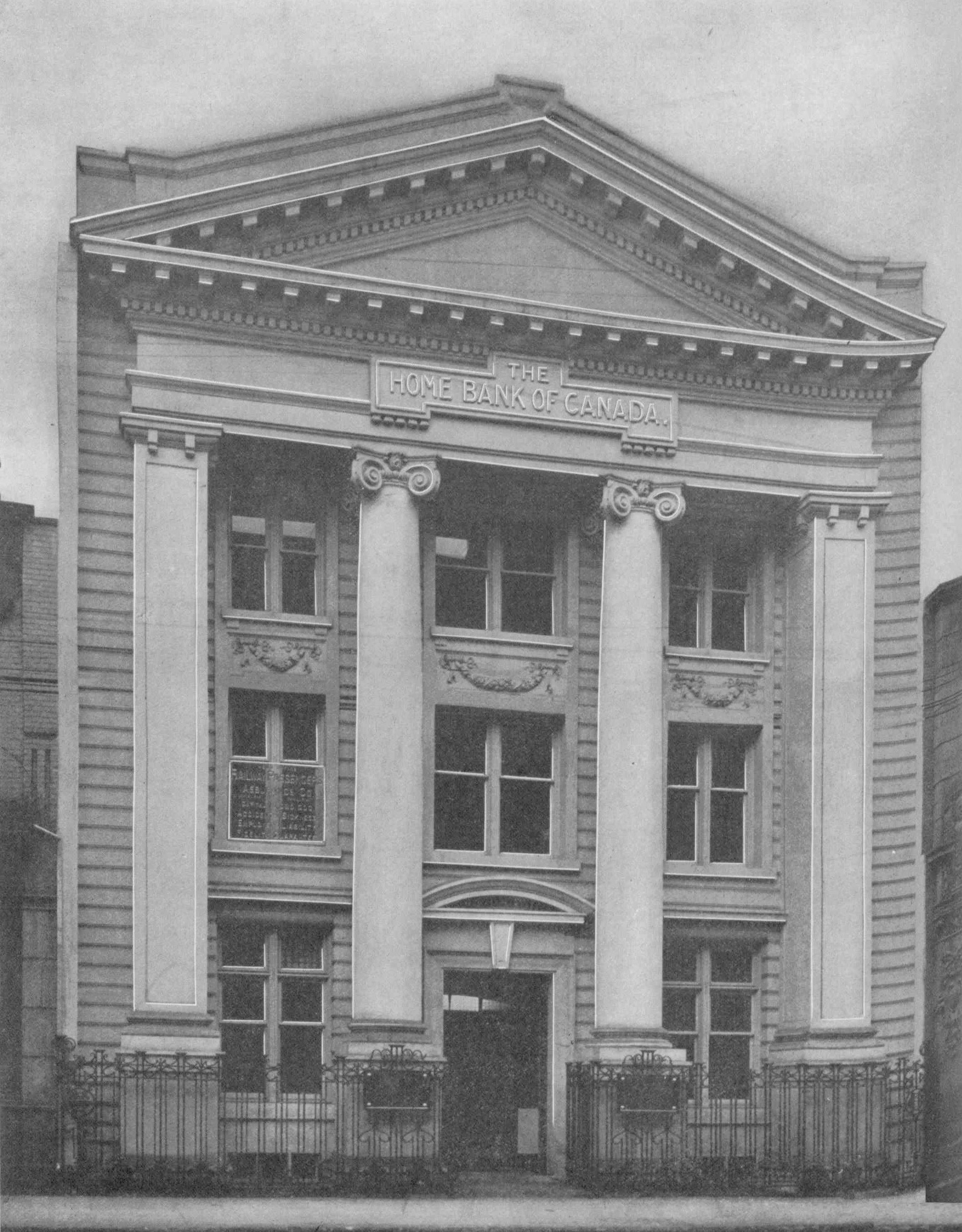
The bank's headquarters at 8 King Street West in Toronto, designed by Edgar Beaumont Jarvis.

Early in its history a number of questionable loans were advanced, including one to A.C. Frost Company to buy timber rights in British Columbia, and another to the New Orleans Gouther and Grand Isle Railway secured by a rolling stock of dilapidated rail cars. In 1912 it undertook a campaign of expanding into Quebec and eastern Canada, to the chagrin of the western Canadian Directors who were seeing much of the bank's capital unavailable for western loans. At the same time, many of the large loans went unpaid and the accrued interest, through a form of bank fraud, was recapitalized onto the principal of the loans.

William Machaffie, Manager of the Winnipeg Branch and a banker since 1882, told the western directors as early as 1914 that the "cooking of the books" through the adding of unpaid interest to the principal and then calculating the interest as profit to pay dividends to major shareholders and directors was wrong. Machaffie wanted to tell the minister of finance at the time, Thomas White, but the western directors were not so sure.

The federal government of the day was not prepared to deal with a bank crisis during wartime. After a leave of absence in 1917 Machaffie returned to his desk to find his position was gone. He wrote a letter to the Minister of Finance which outlined issues regarding bad loans, capitalization of unpaid interest, and accounting malpractice at head office, and stated the only hope for the bank's survival was a merger. He decided not to send the letter to the minister but instead to the Board to "stir things up a bit". He was fired. On August 29, 1918, he drafted a new letter and this time sent it to the Minister of Finance outlining his concerns and a litany of delinquent and non-arm's length loans and issues related to serious flaws in the Home Bank's internal auditing process.

== Collapse ==
The post-war period brought prosperity and the inflationary boom gave Home Bank its share of the Canadian penchant for saving money. The bank opened 28 new branches (for a total of 82) between 1921 and 1923. Though this period, under greater government scrutiny and with the death of Senator James Mason in 1918, the new president of the bank, Herbert Daly faced challenges when he sought to "keep all the balls in the air at the same time".

On 17 August 1923 the bank's main branch did not open, and all branches closed. The provincial and federal government appointed a liquidator, Geoffrey Teignmouth Clarkson of Clarkson Gordon to untangle the mess and seek recovery for the thousands of depositors who had lost millions of dollars in the collapse. Clarkson was highly experienced in liquidating banks, having served as liquidator in at least three prior. After thoroughly reviewing the affairs of the bank he wrote that “Never at any time in its career, was an experienced and trained banker at the head of the bank and in control of its affairs. It can be said that the [bank management] utterly failed to pay regard to or impose elementary safeguards in protection of the business of the bank.”

Previous to the collapse, the major chartered banks intervened in 1920 to control rising prices by raising interest rates. Demand for credit fell, and the resulting recession drove prices down dramatically, making assets worth less than the money loaned to acquire them. During this time, and with the dust storms of the 1922–1923 drought, many farmers lost their land and livelihood.

The indifference of the Eastern banking community led to the success of populist parties in Western Canada and Ontario. In 1922 the United Grain Growers, whose officers comprised the western bank board members, sold all of their shares in the bank. At the same time the Western Canada Pulp and Paper Company defaulted, and, in the spring of 1923 the bank asked Mackenzie King's government for help, which was refused. The stock plummeted, and depositors withdrew money in ever-swelling streams. On the August civic-holiday, J. Cooper Mason, son of the founder and a director, retired to his study and committed suicide.

The Canadian National Railway, whose director Richard F. Gough was also a member of the bank's board, withdrew $1 million just before the collapse.

The bank closed for good August 17, 1923. Ten officials from Home Bank were arrested on charges ranging from concurring with false returns to fraud on October 4, 1923, at a time when the bank's assets were estimated at $2.7 million and liabilities at $15.5 million. 60,000 prairie farmers and a substantial portion of Toronto's Catholic community lost their savings. In the panic that followed the bank's closure, the Ontario Government shored up the Dominion Bank with $1.5 million to stop a deposit run. Herbert Daly, the Home Bank president, had a nervous breakdown and was unable to testify. He died on October 22, 1923.

Liquidator GT Clarkson testified extensively so authorities could better understand the situation.

Cabinet secrecy rules protected politicians from any liability in the matter, and, in a precedent setting bailout, the federal government agreed to pay $5,450,000 to depositors (deposit insurance was not enacted until 1967 in Canada). The government payment provided some settlement to the thousands who lost money as a result of the failure. Findings showed that had the bank been forced to liquidate or merge in 1916 or 1918, its depositors would not have lost anything.

== Bibliography ==
- Johnson, Arthur (1986). Breaking the Banks. Toronto: Lester & Orpen Dennys. pp. xi, 256 p. ISBN 0-88619-072-X.
- Turley-Ewart, John (August–September 2004). "The Bank That Went Bust". The Beaver: Exploring Canada's History. Archived from the original on 2012-11-06 – via HighBeam Research.
