= Clarkson Gordon & Co =

Defunct Canadian accounting & consultancy firm based in Toronto

Clarkson Gordon
- Type: Partnership
- Industry: Professional services
- Founded: 1864 (as Clarkson & Munro)
- Defunct: 1989 (rebranded as EY Canada)
- Headquarters: Toronto, Ontario, Canada
- Area served: Canada; the United States; Brazil
- Key people: Thomas Clarkson (Upper Canada) (Founder): Walter L. Gordon (Name Partner); Geoffrey Teignmouth Clarkson (Managing Partner); Edward Roper Curzon Clarkson (Managing Partner - 1871-1931)
- Services: Accounting; Auditing; Consulting; Tax advisory; Insolvency services
- Divisions: ERC Clarkson & Sons (The Clarkson Company Limited); Woods, Gordon & Co; Clarkson, Gordon & Co; Arthur Young Clarkson Gordon

Clarkson Gordon (also known as Clarkson Gordon & Co) was a national Canadian accounting and receivership business founded in Toronto, Upper Canada in 1864 by Thomas Clarkson and operated for 125 years until the partnership elected to merge with the EY network of firms in 1989 following the merger between Ernst & Whinney and Arthur Young & Co.

The firm was considered a finishing school for Canadian business elite and was known as the pedigreed accounting firm, whose reputation for creating a "Clarkson Man" was that of creating "a gentleman who had been taught from birth if he were lucky, or during his apprenticeship with the firm if he were less so, how things worked in the Canadian elite. Clarkson Men masked their aggressive, innovative energies behind an acceptably circumspect façade of unrelenting hard work, iron-willed self-control, and unerring good manners". Those matters of being a gentleman; what the Globe described as the difference between an accountant and a "Clarkson Man" differed in its description over the years, the Globe's 1965 description was eventually expanded to include: a quiet self-confidence, a willingness to work weekends and holidays and above all, to be willing to lose—or perhaps more aptly leave—a client if the financial data underpinning an audit was misleading.

== Structure and influence ==
Throughout most of the firm's history, the organisation was structured across three separate business lines:

1. accounting and auditing services provided by Clarkson Gordon (and previous iterations including Clarkson & Cross, Clarkson Gordon & Dilworth, etc);
2. management consultancy services provided by Woods Gordon & Co;
3. trustee services, assignee, receivership, liquidation and bankruptcy services through ERC Clarkson & Sons (eventually the Clarkson Company).

The group additionally operated through partnerships with other practices including Clarkson, Cross & Helliwell in Vancouver (Helliwell being one of ERC Clarkson's cousins).

Clarkson Gordon's managing partners are directly attributed for developing key bankruptcy and insolvency reform in Canada, particularly the reforms resulting from the repeal of the insolvency act 1881, the Bankruptcy Act 1919, and the creation of the Banking Act of 1923. The firm's training, particularly the writings of Geoffrey Teignmouth Clarkson and ERC, have been used as foundations of the insolvency and bankruptcy law of Canada. Several innovations in receivership and the development of receivership rules were the result of legal challenges made by the firm in their liquidator roles.

Through the 20th century, Clarkson Gordon provided auditing to all five of Canada's largest banks. Clarkson Gordon was headquartered in Toronto, Ontario, Canada until 1989 when it merged with Ernst & Young following the merger of Ernst & Whinney and Arthur Young & Co, creating the largest accounting firm in the world. At the time of its merger with Ernst & Young, Clarkson Gordon was the second largest firm within the EY Network, and was rebranded as EY Canada in 1989, although EY still retains the copyright.

== History ==
Clarkson Gordon was founded by the Clarkson family in 1864 by Thomas Clarkson (Upper Canada) as Thomas Clarkson & Sons when Thomas was appointed an Official Assignee for the Province of Ontario. Thomas Clarkson was a prominent financier in Toronto, having raised the Exchange building, served as the Board of Trade president and was on the board of directors for several banks including the Bank of Toronto (which he helped establish). As early as 1857, Thomas had served in a proto-auditor role on behalf of the shareholders of the Bank of Toronto known as a "Scrutineer".

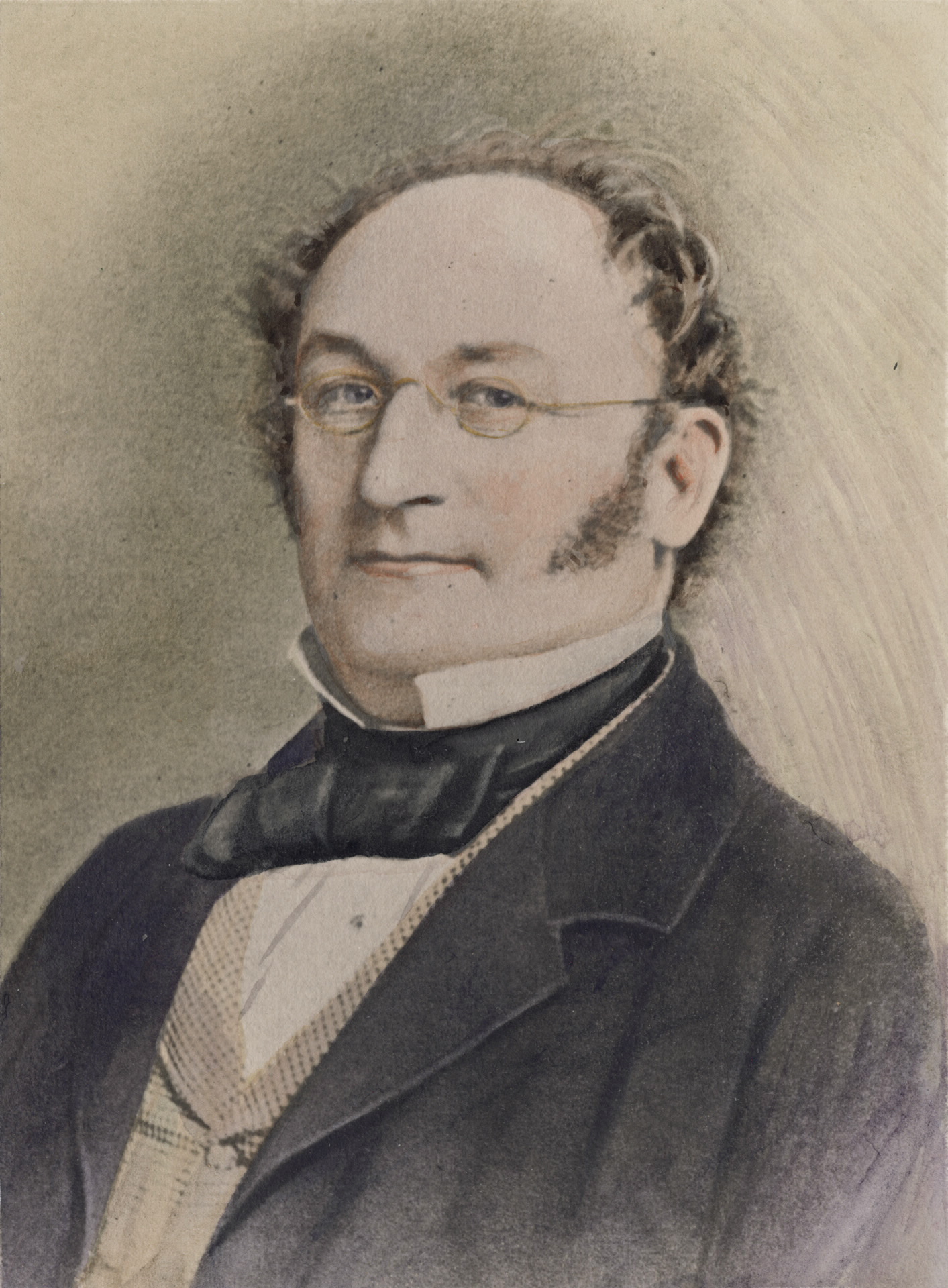
Thomas Clarkson c. 1864

In 1868, Thomas Clarkson was President of the Chamber of Commerce and lacked experienced help. His senior employee, Mr. Thomas Munro was dedicated full-time to the work. By 1872 work was so busy that Thomas recalled his son, Edward Roper Curzon Clarkson (ERC) to Toronto from Montreal and at 18, ERC joined the business. A year later, Thomas suffered a paralytic stroke, ERC was not yet 21 and barred from being appointed a receiver by the province of Upper Canada, ERC formed a partnership with Mr Munro which they called Clarkson & Munro, operating out of the Exchange Buildings at 34 Wellington Street. This partnership lasted until 1877 when Clarkson received his appointment as an official assignee and joined Turner, Clarkson & Co.

By then ERC had become interested in accounting, and along with others in Toronto, was a founding member of the Institute of Accountants of Ontario, a predecessor of the Canadian Institute of Chartered Accountants, serving as the Institute of Accountants of Ontario's first president and widely regarded in his obituaries as the first Canadian chartered accountant,

The professionalisation of the accounting class coincided with ERC transforming his business into two parallel practices: a receivership business known as ERC Clarkson & Sons, and an accounting business known as Clarkson & Cross. William H. Cross, a fiery Mancunian, frequently butt heads with the Institute of Accountants of Ontario leadership (other than Clarkson), particularly after the Confederation Life scandal of 1890 which resulted in Clarkson & Cross investigating the decisions of the company on behalf of shareholders.

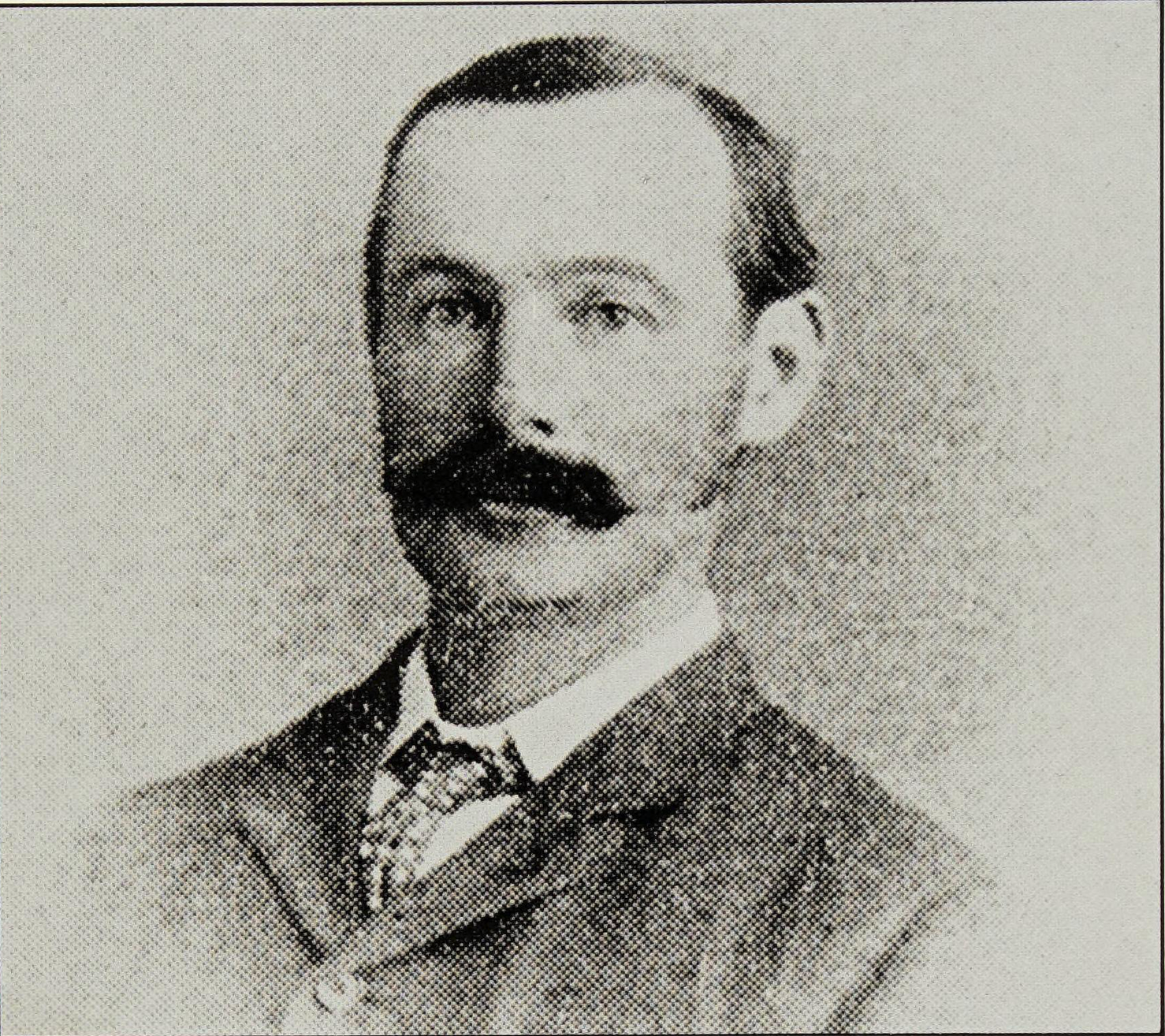
ERC Clarkson

ERC, a prominent member and president of the Toronto Board of Trade, an organisation which his father, Thomas Clarkson (Upper Canada) helped found, used the venue to promote insolvency reform.

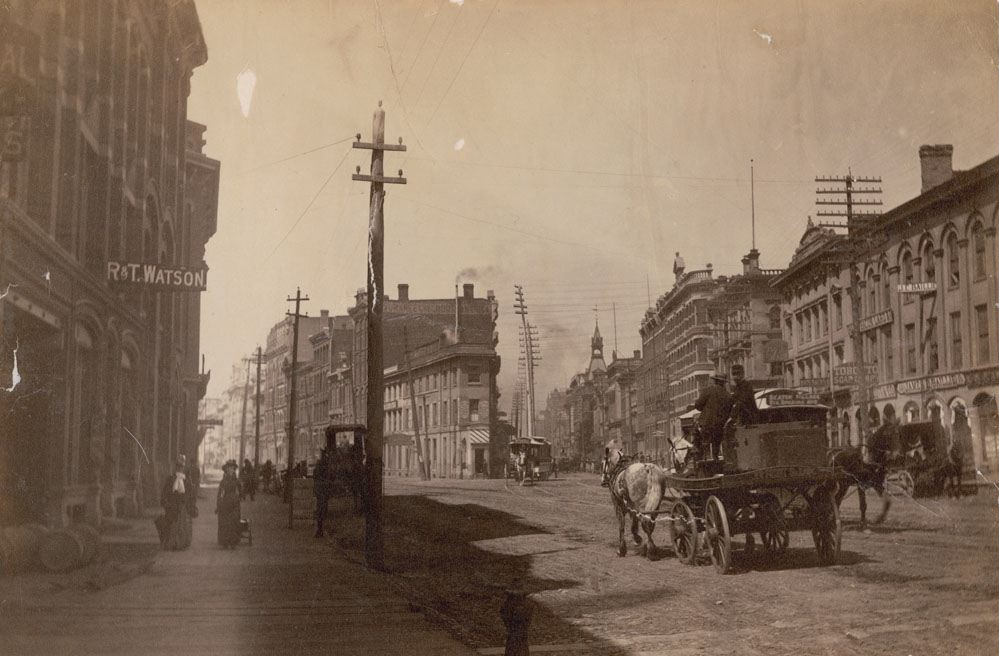
Wellington Street

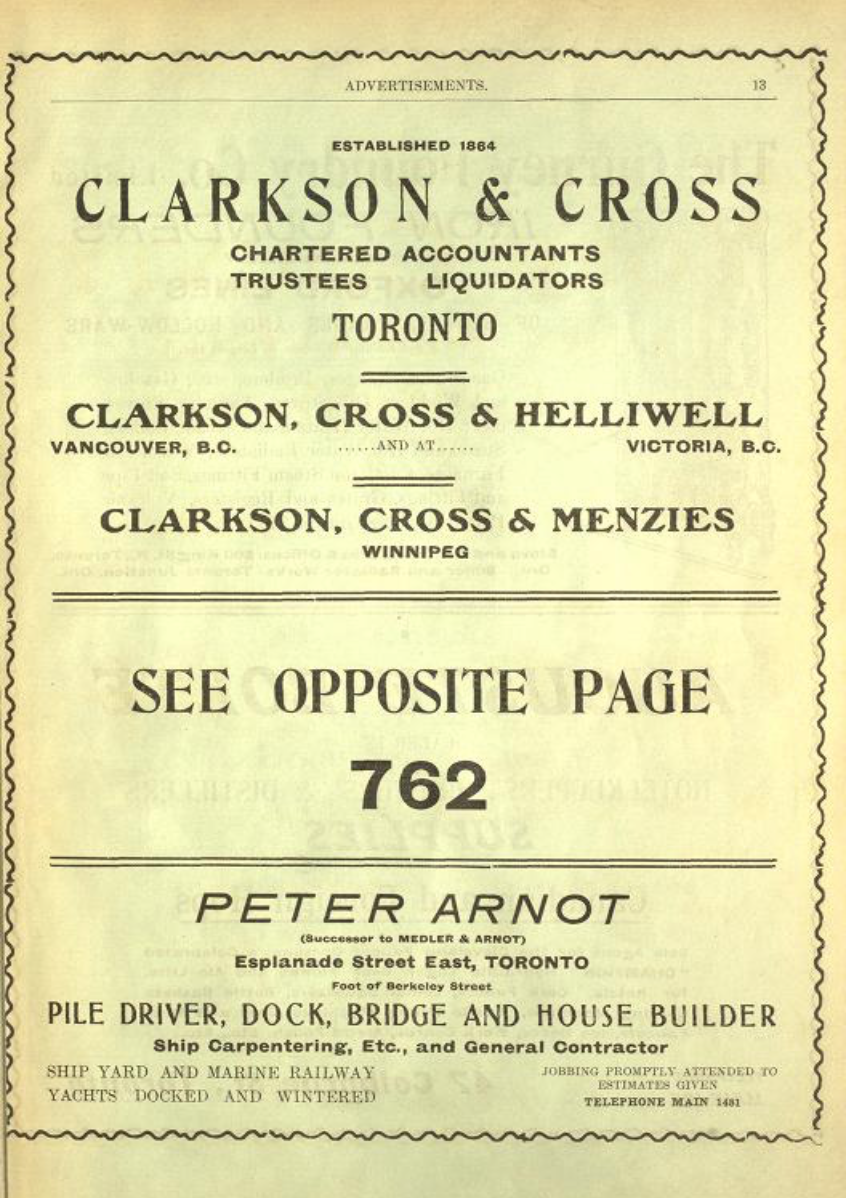

W.H. Cross retired in 1913. By then, the partnership consisted of ERC and his son Geoffrey Teignmouth (GT) Clarkson. Colonel H.D.L. Gordon was selected to replace Cross. ERC Clarkson had known Gordon 1896 when ERC had recommended Gordon go to England and work for Cooper Brothers & Co, a large London-based accounting firm. Gordon had returned in 1898 as a staff with Clarkson & Cross for eight years. demanded his protégé, RJ Dilworth, also become a senior partner and the firm was renamed Clarkson Gordon & Dilworth.

Geoffrey Teignmouth Clarkson, who eventually became the managing partner after ERC's retirement, joined the firm following his qualification as an accountant at 15 in 1893. GT was noted for being particularly private but politically savvy. He, like ERC was a conservative and GT was extremely close with Ontario Premiers Howard Ferguson. GT frequently advised conservative governments on department efficiencies and was appointed to several royal commissions. He was also appointed the auditor of several government businesses or businesses where the major creditor was the government, including, by 1923 no less than 4 defaulted banks: the Ontario Bank, the Sovereign Bank, Farmers’ Bank, and the Monarch Bank and had liquidated dozens of other financing institutions including the Dominion Permanent Loan Company. Later that year he would administer the liquidation of Home Bank. He had also been auditor to the Canadian Bank of Commerce, and a single year in 1901 the Colonial Investment and Loan Company, Bank of Toronto, Dominion Bank, Imperial Bank and the Standard Bank of Canada. Toronto's Hush magazine claimed in the 1930s that GT was known as "Jesus Christ" amongst the Provincial Conservatives in Queen's Park. A fact which so angered GT that he tried to sue the magazine for libel. He was frequently called upon to provide expert evidence at Queen's Park and in Parliament. GT's opinion was deemed critical when drafting the Banking Act 1923 and no changes to the legislation when in committee were to be made without his approval. He often corresponded with Arthur Meighen when Meighen was both Prime Minister and a Senator when giving evidence to the Select Standing Committee on Banking and Commerce in the House of Commons. Indeed his ties to the government were so strong that he was offered the Minister of Finance position under Arthur Meighen's government following the King-Bing affair at the urging of prominent Toronto Conservative figure I.E. Weldon.

GT, like his father, provided the accounting and auditing services of the firm to non-profit and charity organisations, particularly educational institutions free of charge. He served on the board of governors for Havergal College, Upper Canada College, Wycliffe College, and the Hospital for Sick Children. ERC provided the auditing for the University of Toronto until his death and the Canadian Bankers' Association

By the 1930s, Colonel Gordon's son, Walter Gordon joined the firm alongside GT's three sons, Robert Curzon, Geoffrey Perry, and Fredrick Curzon. Walter Gordon The firm established a "best friend" partnership with Arthur Young & Co, sharing services and servicing each other's clients depending on which side of the border the client was on. The two firms also created a joint venture in Brazil. The firm operated out of Quebec and the Maritimes by the firm of Clarkson, Mcdonald, Currie & Co. The firm's name in Ontario and the west soon changed to Clarkson, Gordon, Dilworth, Guilfoyle & Nash.

In 1947 near the end of GT's management, an ancestor of Thomas Clarkson and GT's distant cousin, Gertrude Mulcahy, became the first woman to receive her CA.

In 1989, the firm announced that it would move into the newly constructed Clarkson Gordon Tower at 222 Bay Street. The firm had 420 partners and 2,100 professionals and a sizeable art collection of over 900 pieces, specialising in Canadian artists. Before the firm was able to move into the new complex, Ernst & Whinney and Arthur Young & Co announced that the two firms would merge. The Clarkson Gordon partnership announced that after 125 years it would change its name in Canada to Ernst & Young Canada.

== Notable alumni ==
- Jim Flaherty – former minister of finance
- Edward Roper Curzon Clarkson
- Geoffrey Teignmouth Clarkson
- Thomas Clarkson
- Walter L. Gordon – senior partner and former minister of finance
- Jim Balsillie
- Arthur Labatt
- Bruce Flatt
- John Cleghorn – former chairman & CEO of RBC & SNC-Lavalin
- Cynthia Devine – CFO of Maple Leaf Sports & Entertainment
- Jim McAlpine – President and CEO of Magna Entertainment and EVP and CFO of Magna
- Ronald Osborne – media executive
- George Fink – championship Canadian curler
- Glenn Mifflin – CEO of Cuso International

Sheila Fraser – Auditor General of Canada

karen Hogan - Auditor General of Canada

== See also ==
- Ernst & Young
