= Registered Tax Return Preparer Test =

U.S. Internal Revenue Service (IRS) test

The Registered Tax Return Preparer Test was a test produced by the U.S. Internal Revenue Service (IRS). Until the program was suspended in January 2013, the IRS had implemented rules requiring that certain individuals who wanted to work as tax return preparers pass this test to demonstrate their ability to understand U.S. tax law, tax form preparation and ethical requirements. The competency test was part of an agency effort to better regulate the tax return preparation industry, to improve the accuracy of tax return preparation and to improve service to taxpayers. Candidates who passed the test, a tax compliance check, and met certain other requirements had a new designation: Registered Tax Return Preparer.

In January 2013, the Internal Revenue Service announced that it was suspending the requirement to register with the IRS because of a ruling on January 18, 2013, by the United States District Court for the District of Columbia. As a result of a lawsuit, the Court issued an order prohibiting the Internal Revenue Service from enforcing the regulatory requirements for registered tax return preparers. In accordance with this order, tax return preparers covered by this program are not currently required to register with the IRS. The IRS announced that because of the Court's ruling, tax return preparers are not required to complete the competency testing or to secure the continuing education that had been required.

== History of the RTRP Test ==
An estimated 60 percent of U.S. taxpayers use tax return preparers. The idea of a competency test came from the Return Preparer Review, the product of a series of public hearings with tax preparers, associations and consumer advocates. The review was prompted by the growth in the tax preparation industry, much of it unregulated. There were increasing concerns within the IRS and growing congressional interest in the accuracy of tax return preparation and service to the nation's taxpayers by tax professionals. One U.S. Government Accountability Office report found that of 19 individual tax returns taken to professional tax return preparers, all 19 contained errors and only two reflected the correct refund amount.

After the Return Preparer Review was announced in January 2010, the IRS instituted the Return Preparer Initiative that required all professional tax return preparers to register with the IRS and to obtain a Preparer Tax Identification Number (PTIN). It also required a previously unregulated category of preparers, then known as unenrolled preparers, to pass a one-time competency test, and to take 15 hours of continuing education credits annually. Those who passed the test and a tax compliance check would be given a new credential: Registered Tax Return Preparer. The test was launched in November 2010. Under the original rules, preparers with PTINs who needed to test were given until December 31, 2013, to pass it. The IRS intended that starting January 1, 2014, only Registered Tax Return Preparers, Certified Public Accountants, attorneys, and Enrolled Agents would be authorized to prepare and sign federal individual tax returns for compensation. However, these deadlines and exclusivity rules were halted when a federal court suspended the RTRP program in January 2013.

== Who was required to take the RTRP Test ==
Under the rules prior to their suspension in January 2013, the general rule was that any paid tax return preparer who was not a Certified Public Accountant (CPA), attorney or Enrolled Agent was required to take the Registered Tax Return Preparer test. Preparers who do not prepare any Form 1040 series returns were exempt. Also exempt were non-signing preparers supervised by CPAs, attorneys or Enrolled Agents, and who worked at firms 80 percent owned by CPAs, attorneys or Enrolled Agents. The IRS estimates that there are more than 340,000 tax return preparers who must take and pass the test. An IRS YouTube video explained the test. The IRS wanted as many preparers as possible to take the test before the IRS launched a new searchable database allowing prospective clients or potential tax prep employers to search preparers' names and credentials.

CPAs, attorneys and Enrolled Agents are already tested during the process of obtaining their credentials, and were exempt from the RTRP testing requirement. CPAs have passed the Uniform Certified Public Accountant Examination, attorneys have passed bar exams, and Enrolled Agents have passed a three-part IRS test called the Special Enrollment Exam (SEE), which covers individual taxation, business taxation and representation issues.

== RTRP Test details ==
The Registered Tax Return Preparer Test was a timed, 2.5-hour exam. The test was available only in English. The exam had 120 questions. Tax-related questions were in multiple-choice format. Ethics questions were true and false. The questions were developed by the IRS and the IRS test vendor, Prometric, Inc., based on a job analysis survey sent to 700,000 tax return preparers. The computer-based exam must be taken at one of 260 U.S. test centers operated by Prometric. The test covered preparation of the Form 1040 series and its related schedules. During the test, preparers had electronic access to Publication 17, Tax Guide For Individuals, the Form 1040 and Form 1040 Instructions. Test-takers were prohibited from bringing their own materials into the testing room.

Subject areas may include:

- Preliminary work and collection of taxpayer data
- Treatment of income and assets
- Deductions and credits
- Other taxes
- Completion of the filing process
- Practices and procedures
- Ethics

Study materials for tax year 2011 (valid through April 1, 2013)
Form 1040	
Form 1040 Instructions	
Publication 17	Tax Guide for Individuals
Circular 230	(rev. 8/2011)
Publication 334	Tax Guide for Small Business
Publication 970	Tax Benefits for Education
Form 6251	Alternative Minimum Tax - Individuals
Form 6251	Instructions
Form 8879	IRS e-file Signature Authorization
Publication 596	Earned Income Credit
Form 8867	Paid Preparer's Earned Income Credit Checklist
Form 2848	Power of Attorney and Declaration of Representation
Form 2848 Instructions	
Form 8821	Tax Information Authorization
Publication 1345	Handbook for Authorized IRS e-file Providers
Publication 4600	Safeguarding Taxpayer Information

== Universities and associations establish classes ==
Courses are beginning to form at major universities across the country as accredited educational institutions begin to offer curriculums geared to help tax practitioners meet the new tax return preparer competency examination requirements. Many of the university and association educators who offer tax preparer exam courses also register with the IRS as continuing education providers in order to qualify their courses for continuing education credit. Only IRS approved education providers may offer courses for the required 15 hours of continuing education, which include 2 hours of Ethics, 3 hours of Federal Tax Law Updates, and 10 hours of other Federal Tax Law.

== RTRP Test scoring ==
A perfect score on the test is 500. A score 350 or more is required for passing. Candidates will be told at the test centers whether they passed or failed the test. Only those candidates who fail the test will be given their test scores so they can understand their areas of weakness.

== Scheduling the RTRP Test ==
Candidates for the Registered Tax Return Preparer Test can use their online PTIN accounts at www.irs.gov/ptin to link to Prometric's online scheduling system. They can select from among 260 test locations, a date and time. A $116 non-refundable fee must be paid electronically when scheduling the appointment. The test can be taken at any time of the year except April 1-April 15, an annual black-out period. After scheduling a date, candidates will receive a confirmation email from Prometric. Candidates who are late or absent forfeit their $116 fee.

There are no limits on the number of times candidates can take the test, but the $116 fee applies each time.

== Suspension of the program ==
In January 2013, the IRS issued the following announcement:

As of Friday, Jan. 18, 2013, the United States District Court for the District of Columbia has enjoined the Internal Revenue Service from enforcing the regulatory requirements for registered tax return preparers. In accordance with this order, tax return preparers covered by this program are not currently required to register with the IRS, to complete competency testing or secure continuing education. The ruling does not affect the regulatory practice requirements for CPAs, attorneys, enrolled agents, enrolled retirement plan agents or enrolled actuaries.

The Internal Revenue Service, working with the Department of Justice, continues to have confidence in the scope of its authority to administer this program. On Wednesday, Jan. 24, the IRS and Justice Department asked for the injunction to be lifted. Regardless of the outcome of that request, an appeal is planned within the next 30 days.

The IRS is continuing to evaluate the scope of the court's order in determining consistent next steps......
