= IRS Return Preparer Initiative =

The IRS Return Preparer Initiative was an effort by the Internal Revenue Service (IRS) to regulate the tax return preparation industry in the United States. The purpose of the initiative is to improve taxpayer compliance and service by setting professional standards for and providing support to the tax preparation industry. Starting January 1, 2011 and, until the program was suspended in January 2013, the initiative required all paid federal tax return preparers to register with the IRS and to obtain an identification number, called a Preparer Tax Identification Number (PTIN). The multi-year phase-in effort called for certain paid tax return preparers to pass a competency test and to take annual continuing education courses. The ethics provisions found in Treasury Department's Circular 230 were extended to all paid tax return preparers. Preparers who have their PTINs, pass the test and complete education credits were to have a new designation: Registered Tax Return Preparer.

"I believe it is one of the most important initiatives and defining actions that the IRS has taken in recent years in improving both compliance and our ability to deliver better service to taxpayers; in this case, helping them to file accurate returns from the get-go and avoid potentially time-consuming problems later on," said IRS Commissioner Douglas Shulman.

In January 2013, the Internal Revenue Service announced that it was suspending the program following a ruling on January 18, 2013, by the United States District Court for the District of Columbia. As a result of a lawsuit, the Court issued an order prohibiting the IRS from enforcing the regulatory requirements for registered tax return preparers. In accordance with this order, tax return preparers covered by the program are not currently required to register with the IRS. The IRS also announced that, because of the Court's ruling, preparers are no longer required to complete competency testing or obtain the continuing education that had previously been mandatory. The IRS failed in its effort to obtain a stay of the ruling, which was then affirmed (upheld) in February 2014 by the U.S. Court of Appeals for the District of Columbia Circuit.

== Initiative Background ==
Prior to the IRS Return Preparer Initiative, anyone could enter the tax return business. The lack of training or minimum qualifications for paid federal tax return preparers resulted in concerns that some ill-equipped tax preparers were making numerous errors costly to taxpayers and to the United States Treasury. Income tax laws in the United States are complex and change nearly every year. United States Taxpayer Advocate Nina E. Olson, in her 2002 annual report to Congress, suggested legislation to register and regulate paid tax preparers. In 2006, the GAO testified that the agency secretly visited 19 different paid tax preparers. The agency found that all 19 tax returns were wrong to some degree and that only two preparers correctly calculated the proper refund amount. In 2008, the Government Accountability Office (GAO) followed up with a review of how Oregon and California, the only states to regulate tax preparers, addressed the issue. On June 4, 2009, Commissioner Douglas Shulman announced that the IRS would conduct a thorough review of the issues related to regulating paid tax return preparers.

== Return preparer review ==
On January 4, 2010, IRS Commissioner Shulman announced the results of a six-month study that included public hearings with consumer advocates, other government agencies and tax professionals. The Return Preparer Review Final Report (IRS Publication 4832) outlined the increasing importance of the tax preparation industry as tax law becomes more complex and taxpayers seek help in preparing accurate tax returns. As of 2008, eighty percent of taxpayers were seeking third party assistance, either from tax preparers or tax software, to prepare and file their federal tax returns. The report found that the number of paid tax return preparers was difficult to determine, ranging anywhere from 900,000 to 1.2 million people. "There is general agreement that tax return preparers and the associated industry play a pivotal role in our system of tax administration and they must be a part of any strategy to strengthen the integrity of the tax system. And, more directly, the American public overwhelmingly supports efforts to increase the oversight of paid tax return preparers," the report concluded. The report recommended a new Return Preparer Initiative related to registration, testing, continuing education and ethics.

The publication contains a comprehensive overview of the 2009 IRS study and outlines eight categories of recommendations. However, some recommendations are being implemented differently than originally proposed. Official IRS regulations, not the Return Preparer Review, provide the final guidance for implementing the recommendations.

== PTIN registration ==
The first significant step was the registration of all paid tax preparers. Starting January 1, 2011, anyone who for compensation prepares or helps prepare all or substantially all of any federal tax return or claim for refund was required to register with the IRS. Preparers were required to obtain and use a Preparer Tax Identification Number (PTIN) on returns they prepared and signed. Previously, use of the PTIN on tax returns was optional. On September 28, 2010, the IRS launched a new PTIN sign-up system that required preparers to create online accounts, complete the PTIN application, pay a $64.25 fee and obtain a PTIN. There also was a new PTIN paper application, Form W-12. The online PTIN account also could be used to schedule a date and time for the competency test and, eventually, to track continuing education credit hours.

Preparers were required to renew their PTINs annually. The PTIN was valid for a calendar year, expiring each December 31. The renewal period begins in mid-October each year. The renewal fee is $63. Through the registration process, the IRS also planned to create a searchable data-base that would allow taxpayers to determine whether the preparer is compliant with IRS requirements or to find a compliant preparer within the taxpayer's zip code area.

Until the registration process, the IRS did not have reliable data on the number of tax preparers nationwide. In the first year, more than 840,000 preparers registered for a PTIN. For 2012, there were 715,000 preparers with valid PTINs.

== Registered Tax Return Preparer Competency test ==
Starting November 2011, the IRS launched a new competency test that, until the program was suspended in 2013, certain preparers were required to take and pass. Preparers who are Certified Public Accountants (CPAs), attorneys and Enrolled Agents were exempt from this test because they have other exam requirements. Also exempt were supervised preparers - those who do not sign returns, who work for a firm owned by and are supervised by a CPA, attorney or enrolled agent - and preparers who prepare no individual tax returns. This left approximately 340,000 preparers who were required to pass the test and to become Registered Tax Return Preparers.

The test was a timed, two and a half hour test that was required to be taken at one of the 260 testing centers operated by test vendor Prometric, Inc. The exam covered the Form 1040 series and its schedules. There were 120 questions. Most were multiple choice. Questions on ethics were in true or false format. The test fee was $116. Preparers were to be notified immediately if they passed the test but were not informed of their test scores.

The IRS and Prometric created a Candidate Information Bulletin, a test tutorial, a video about what to expect on test day, and a list of testing center locations, as well as a list of study materials. These study materials were to change each April. Test takers were to have access to some electronic materials, such as Publication 17, while taking the test. The IRS was not to provide test preparation courses. However, for 2012 and 2013, test preparation courses taken from an approved IRS vendor were to count toward continuing education course requirements. The IRS also issued Fact Sheet 2011-12 to explain the test.

== Continuing education ==
Until the program was suspended, preparers with a testing requirement were also to have a requirement to complete 15 hours of continuing education credits each year. The credits were to include 10 hours of general federal tax law topics, 3 hours of federal tax law updates and 2 hours of ethics. CPAs, attorneys and enrolled agents, who are in good standing with their professional organization, were exempt from this provision because of their pre-existing education professional requirements. Supervised preparers and non-1040 preparers were also exempt.

Preparers were required to take courses from only those providers approved by the IRS. Preparers were required to review the offerings to determine what courses suit their situations. Providers were to issue certificates of completion to preparers and to report completions to the IRS based on the preparers' PTINs. Preparers were required to retain details about their course work in their records for at least four years. Eventually, preparers were to be able to use their online PTIN accounts to keep track of their credit hours.

== Ethics ==
Prior to the Return Preparer Initiative, standard ethical guidelines did not apply to some federal return preparers. The initiative extended the ethical provisions set out by Treasury's Circular 230 to all paid federal tax return preparers.

== Registered Tax Return Preparers ==
Preparers who passed the Registered Tax Return Preparer test and who passed an IRS-run tax compliance check were to be given a new title: Registered Tax Return Preparer. After 2013, only Registered Tax Return Preparers, Enrolled Agents, Certified Public Accountants or attorneys were to be able to legally prepare federal tax returns for individuals for compensation.

== Electronic filing requirement ==
In November 2009, Congress adopted a provision that required federal tax return preparers to use IRS e-file to submit returns. Beginning in 2012, preparers expecting to prepare and file eleven or more individual tax returns were expected to electronically file the returns. In order to e-file, a preparer must become an Authorized IRS e-file Provider. Preparers were to be able to use IRS e-services to submit an application.

== Return Preparer Office ==
In October 2010 speech, IRS Commissioner Shulman announced the creation of a Return Preparer Office. The Return Preparer Office was to be responsible for implementing the new requirements and for oversight of the IRS return preparer program. The Office was to work in partnership with the Office of Professional Responsibility, which is responsible for the enforcement of Circular 230 conduct issues.

== U.S. Treasury regulations ==
In order to implement the Return Preparer Initiative, the IRS and the Treasury Department have issued a series of proposed and final regulations and guidance documents. Those items are compiled on a New Return Preparer Regulations page.

== Suspension of the program ==
In January 2013, the IRS issued the following announcement:

As of Friday, Jan. 18, 2013, the United States District Court for the District of Columbia has enjoined the Internal Revenue Service from enforcing the regulatory requirements for registered tax return preparers. In accordance with this order, tax return preparers covered by this program are not currently required to register with the IRS, to complete competency testing or secure continuing education. The ruling does not affect the regulatory practice requirements for CPAs, attorneys, enrolled agents, enrolled retirement plan agents or enrolled actuaries.

The Internal Revenue Service, working with the Department of Justice, continues to have confidence in the scope of its authority to administer this program. On Wednesday, Jan. 24, the IRS and Justice Department asked for the injunction to be lifted. Regardless of the outcome of that request, an appeal is planned within the next 30 days.

The IRS is continuing to evaluate the scope of the court's order in determining consistent next steps......

The court decision which triggered the suspension of the program was upheld by the U.S. Court of Appeals for the D.C. Circuit in February 2014.
