= Florida Institute of Certified Public Accountants =

The Florida Institute of Certified Public Accountants (FICPA) is a professional membership organization headquartered in Orlando. The FICPA represents approximately 18,500 CPAs and accounting professionals in Florida and beyond. Shelly Weir is the FICPA's president Julian Dozier, CPA, is the institute's 2022–2023 Board Chair.

The FICPA provides opportunities for professional development, knowledge sharing, networking, community involvement, leadership and camaraderie while lobbying the Florida Legislature on issues that affect CPAs and promoting the CPA designation. The FICPA also works closely with the Florida Department of Business and Professional Regulation to warn the public on using unlicensed CPAs. It is also one of the 11 nonprofit members of the Federation of Schools of Accountancy.

In December 2014, Forbes listed FICPA number 19 on The 100 Must-Follow Tax Twitter Feeds.

== History ==
=== Early history ===
The FICPA was founded in 1905. Walter Mucklow, T.G. Hutchinson and two other Florida accountants envisioned an association that would promote the exchange of ideas, enhance confidence in public accountants among businessmen, and encourage a high standard of efficiency in the science of accounting and the art of bookkeeping. These four men lobbied the Legislature and pushed through the first accountancy law in the Southern states. They created an accountancy exam. On April 20, 1905, they organized into a group of accountants under the name Florida Society of Accountants.

One of the first acts of the newly formed Society was the publication of a pamphlet describing the objectives of the Society, which were to promote a higher standard of efficiency in the science of accounting and the art of bookkeeping; to bring together those interested directly or indirectly in matters of accounting, to promote the exchange of ideas, and to encourage mutual assistance between members; to encourage the adoption of improved methods and to secure uniformity in matters of accounting; and to promote confidence between the public accountant, the bookkeeper, and the man of business.

For its first activity, the Society directed the collective energies of its members towards securing passage of an accountancy law. This was no easy task; while few states had such laws, none had been passed in any of the Southern States.

The principal efforts towards securing passage of the accountancy law were expanded by the Society's special legislative committee, composed of T.G. Hutchinson and John A. Hansbrough. Governor Napoleon B. Broward signed Florida's first accountancy act on June 5, 1905 and Florida became the eighth state in the Union to pass an accountancy law, being preceded by New York, 1896; Pennsylvania, 1899; Maryland, 1900; California, 1901; Illinois, 1903; Washington, 1903; and New Jersey, 1904.

A relatively simple Florida law, the 1905 accountancy act set up a three-member State Board of Accountancy and prescribed its powers and duties to provide for the examination of qualified accountants and to provide penalties for violations. The Board also was authorized to grant certificates to those candidates who passed the prescribed tests. The first State Board of Accountancy appointed by Governor Broward was composed of Mucklow, E.I. Matthews and George R. DeSaussure. The Board immediately began to function and granted its first five certificates.

=== Switch to Certified Public Accountants ===
As interest and activity in accountancy increased, the members of the Florida Society of Accountants gradually arrived at the decision to restrict membership to Certified Public Accountants. This necessitated the reorganization of the group under the new name of the Florida Society of Certified Public Accountants in 1916. Membership in the Society was limited to American citizens who held Certified Public Accountant certificates, issue by any State and who had been in continuous practice for themselves or in the office a public accountant for three years. Associate membership was limited to Certified Public Accountants who had not been in practice for three years.

The period from 1917 to 1923 was one of little activity for the Society's affairs. World War I and economic adjustments that occurred shortly after that conflict claimed most of the accounting profession's attention. The Florida Boom of the early 1920s left members with little time to advance the public accounting profession through Society activities.

The Society reorganized in 1924 under the name Society of Certified Public Accountants in Florida. Officers were Walter Mucklow, president' T.G. Hutchinson and John A. Hansbrough, vice-presidents; J.M. Jordan, secretary; and Robert Pentland, treasurer. The Society had 20 members in total.

Early in 1927, serious thought was given to the ethics of the profession, including such matters as advertising and solicitation of accounting work. It was decided that the accountancy law should be amended or rewritten. A revised accountancy law was approved by the Governor to become effective July 1, 1927. The adoption of revised accountancy law attracted not only the attention of Florida accountants but that of practitioners around the nation.

In 1928, the Society was officially incorporated under the name Florida Institute of Accountants..

=== Recent history ===
In 1955, the Florida Society of Certified Public Accountants was renamed the Florida Institute of Certified Public Accountants (FICPA), which is their current name. At the time, there were 811 members and 350 candidates sat for the CPA exam.

With interests in building a governmental relations program, the Board of Governors voted in 1979 to relocate the FICPA's headquarters to Tallahassee, Florida. In 1985, the FICPA moved into its new, official headquarters within walking distance of the Florida State Capitol. Four years later, the building was expanded.

The organization employs 65 association professionals, who focus on programs to enhance members' competency and professionalism; support standards of independence, integrity and objectivity that also are in the public interest; promote community involvement; and monitor and actively participate in the public policy-making process.

In 2021, the FICPA moved its headquarters to Orlando, Florida.

=== Past FICPA Presidents/Chairs ===
Chairs *Julian Dozier (2022-2023)

- Kristin A. Bivona (2021-2022)
- W. G. Spoor (2020-2021)
- Abby Depree (2019–2020)
- Gary Fracassi (2018–2019)
- Alan West (2017–2018)
- Joey Epstein (2016–2017)
- Mia Thomas (2015–2016)
- Jeff Barbacci (2014–2015)
- Ken Strauss (2013–2014)
- Scott Price (2012–2013)

In 2012, the FICPA changed its governance structure renaming the volunteer leadership title of President to Chair and changing the title of the CEO to President and CEO. The Board of Governors was renamed the Council at the same time.

Presidents

- Stam Stathis (2011–12)
- Michael R. Pender Jr. (2010–11)
- Jose Valiente (2009–10)
- Ben A. "Steve" Stevens, III (2008–09)
- David L. "Dave" Dennis (2007–08)
- Beryl H. "Berri" Davis (2006–07)
- Richard A. Berkowitz (2005–06)
- Tommye E. Barie (2004–05)
- Dominic C. "Dom" Pino (2003–04)
- Winston K. Howell (2002–03)
- J. Stephen Nouss (2001–02)
- Ron Thompkins (2000–01)
- Jeffrey H. Greene (1999-00)
- Carol P. Deegan (1998–99)
- Barbara A. Burner (1997–98)
- Wayne N. "Skipp" Fraser (1996–97)
- Alan C. Fisk (1995–96)
- Randy W. Moore (1994–95)
- Ramon A. Rodriguez (1993–94)
- Robert J. Batson (1992–93)
- John R. Rowe Jr. (1991–92)
- Robert R. Harris (1990–91)
- William D. Pruitt (1989–90)
- Scott T. Rhine (1988–89)
- Wilber G. Van Scoik (1987–88)
- E. M. "Jim" Campbell Jr. (1986–87)
- Sharon C. Brown (1985–86)
- James M. Lane (1984–85)
- Arthur J. Stites (1983–84)
- Jack E. Brooks (1982–83)
- Raymond L. Crippen (1981–82)
- Morton L. Weinberger (1980–81)
- Patrick J. Knipe (1979–80)
- Donald P. Zima (1978–79)
- Harold E. Walker (1977–78)
- Russell S. Bogue Jr. (1976–77)
- I. Jerry Bloom (1975–76)
- Louis W. Dooner (1974–75)
- Jerome A. Schine (1973–74)
- Robert C. Ellyson (1972–73)
- James T. Lang (1971–72)
- Drakon B. Odom (1970–71)
- Jerrold S. Trumbower (1969–70)
- Harry E. Hurst (1968–69)
- James W. Kindelan (1967–68)
- George E. Tornwall Jr. (1966–67)
- Arthur L. Shealy Jr. (1965–66)
- Robert F. Stonerock (1964–65)
- Barney Bernstein (1963–64)
- Jack W. Lucas (1962–63)
- Richard E. Darby (1961–62)
- William Bond (1960–61)
- Thomas E. Triplett (1959–60)
- R. Bob Smith (1958–59)
- Lyndon C. Conlon (1957–58)
- Richard L. Barnes (1956–57)
- Mark W. Eastland Jr. (1955–56)
- Robert M. Altemus (1954–55)
- Harry W. Bower (1953–54)
- Jewell A. Davis (1952–53)
- Charles S. Roberts (1951–52)
- Gordon P. Blitch (1950–51)
- Roy L. Purvis (1949–50)
- Robert M. Morgan (1948–49)
- Paul R. Smoak (1947–48)
- Russell S. Bogue (1946–47)
- O. J. Oosterhoudt (1945–46)
- Leonard L. Abess (1944–45)
- Charles H. Lindfors (1943–44)
- Joseph A. Sweeney (1942–43)
- Claude K. Milligan (1941–42)
- Manuel A. Montenegro (1940–41)
- James I. Keller Jr. (1939–40)
- Harry M. Turnburke (1938–39)
- Prim W. Fisher (1937–38)
- R. Warner Ring (1936–37)
- Charles H. Goodrich (1935–36)
- Charles C. Potter (1934–35)
- Frank Brooks Colley (1933–34)
- Elon Russell Sheldon (1932–33)
- Benjamin E. James (1931–32)
- Hugh F. Purvis (1930–31)
- Jay E. Bigham (1929–30)
- Walter Muckalow (1928–29)

== Role and objectives ==
Affiliation with the FICPA represents commitment to the CPA profession, including adherence to the Code of Professional Conduct and to a stringent set of professional and technical standards. In addition to ensuring that standards are met, the FICPA provides information and resources that enable CPAs to enhance the quality of their services.

Publications such as Florida CPA Today, the FICPA's bi-monthly magazine and NewsFlash, the institute's electronic newsletter, update members and invite CPAs to share their expertise on important professional and public issues with members of the business community, the media and the public.

The FICPA has eight fundamental objectives around which all of its activities, benefits and services revolve. Its website states those objectives as:

1. To foster ethical conduct and promote standards of independence, integrity and objectivity in the profession.
2. To promote the establishment and maintenance of high educational and professional requirements for persons in the profession.
3. To monitor and actively participate in public policy-making processes that impact the profession.
4. To collect, analyze and interpret data on changing market, economic, governmental and technological conditions affecting the profession.
5. To encourage the analysis, discussion and understanding of issues and trends in the profession.
6. To expand the public's knowledge and understanding of the profession.
7. To maintain relationships and activities with other organizations in pursuit of the institute's mission.
8. To provide an organizational structure that efficiently utilizes volunteer-leader and professional-staff resources for the continuing development of programs that effectively address the expectations of all members.

== Membership ==
With more than 19,500 members, the Florida Institute of CPAs is one of the largest CPA organizations in the United States.

The FICPA serves Florida CPAs from all areas of practice, including public accounting, industry and government. The institute also provides specialized membership to meet the needs of accounting professionals who are not yet certified, accounting educators, professional affiliates, accounting firm administrators and students.

The FICPA membership is organized through 26 chapters across Florida. These chapters are further grouped into six geographical regions. Each region and the chapters within that region hold and promote programming of local interest and provide a conduit for communication with the FICPA leadership. Participation in local chapters provides members with the opportunity to develop leadership skills by taking an active role in both the Institute and the profession.

Members of the FICPA may also participate in leadership through the organization's 31 committees to help facilitate networking, community outreach, conference-planning, professional development and information dissemination.

=== Young CPAs ===
As a committee of the FICPA, the Young CPA Committee (YCPA) is geared towards developing ways to engage young CPAs (age 35 and under) in the accounting profession.

The Young CPA Committee's goals are to provide increased networking opportunities for young CPAs by developing and promoting strong local YCPA organizations across the state; organize and support philanthropic events sponsored by YCPA organizations across the state; and to encourage other young CPAs to get involved with the FICPA and the profession as a whole.

== Advocacy ==
The FICPA serves as a liaison for the CPA profession with various legislative and regulatory agencies in Florida. The FICPA's Governmental Affairs team helps develop annual proposed legislative and regulatory policies; monitors state legislation and regulatory actions; lobbies on behalf of the FICPA; and communicates changes to FICPA members. Fourth-generation Floridian and FSU graduate, Justin Thames is the current Director of Governmental Affairs.

=== Florida CPA/PAC ===
The CPA/PAC is an entity completely separate from the FICPA. It is supported solely by the voluntary contributions of the FICPA's members and others. The objective of the Florida CPA/PAC is to help protect the trust, confidence and esteem the CPA certificate holds in the public's eye.

In 2001, the Florida CPA/PAC was separated into three geographic regions. Each chapter is "nested" into one of the three regions. Members are assigned to one of the three regional CPA/PACs based on geographic location:

- North (includes 11 chapters)
- Central (includes 9 chapters)
- South (includes 7 chapters)

== Continuing professional education ==
The FICPA helps CPAs meet continuing professional education (CPE) requirements by coordinating hundreds of in-person events across Florida as well as webcasts, webinars and on-demand courses. The Florida Board of Accountancy requires license holders to complete 80 hours of CPE for each re-establishment period, including at least 8 hours of accounting and auditing credit and four hours of ethics credit. The Florida Board of Accountancy has designated the FICPA can provide ethics courses and is a Continuing Education Ethics Provider.

The Florida Institute of CPAs is registered with the National Association of State Boards of Accountancy as a Quality Assurance Service sponsor of continuing professional education.

== Educational foundation ==
The FICPA Educational Foundation, Inc., is a not-for-profit organization that raises money to provide scholarships and educational programs to and for Florida's prospective and current accounting students.

Established in 1959, the FICPA Educational Foundation has provided more than $3 million in scholarships and education programs to support Florida's accounting students. Through the donations of FICPA members, the Foundation continues to provide more than $200,000 a year in scholarships to assist Florida's future CPA leaders.

Scholarships are coordinated with Florida Colleges and Universities, including the following state universities:

- Florida A&M University
- Florida Atlantic University
- Florida Gulf Coast University
- Florida International University
- Florida State University
- University of Central Florida
- University of Florida
- University of South Florida – three scholarships for $2,000 each
- University of West Florida

Other colleges and universities:

- Barry University
- Bethune–Cookman University
- Flagler College
- Florida Institute of Technology
- Florida Southern College
- Hodges University
- Jacksonville University
- Nova Southeastern University
- St. Leo University
- St. Thomas University
- Southeastern University
- Stetson University
- University of Tampa
