= National Society of Accountants =

The National Society of Public Accountants (NSPA), later shortened to the National Society of Accountants (NSA), is a professional association for tax and accounting professionals. Together with its state affiliates, the NSA represents more than 30,000 independent practitioners who provide accounting, tax, auditing, financial and estate planning, and management services to 19 million individuals and businesses. NSA's mission is to provide national leadership in the profession of accountancy and taxation through the advocacy of practice rights, and through the establishment and promotion of high standards in ethics, education, and professional excellence.

== History ==
The NSA was incorporated as a nonprofit corporation, the National Society of Public Accountants (NSPA), in 1945 to promote professionalism and to ensure its members had the right to represent their clients before the U.S. Treasury Department. Its first headquarters was in Oklahoma City, followed by a move to St. Louis in 1947, and then to Washington, D.C., in 1955. The name was changed to the National Society of Accountants in 1995, although the organization still retains "National Society of Public Accountants" as its official name.

== Education and events ==
The NSA provides continuing professional education (CPE) through online, on-demand webinars, training seminars, and self-study exam preparation courses. The organization also holds an annual conference with live CPE programs, alongside an Enrolled Agent Review Course, an Accredited Tax Preparer Review Course, and an Individual Form 1040 Tax Seminar.

The NSA is an approved CPE sponsor recognized by the National Association of State Boards of Accountancy (NASBA), the Internal Revenue Service (IRS), the Accreditation Council for Accountancy and Taxation (ACAT), and the California Tax Education Council (CTEC).

== Scholarships ==
Formed in 1969, the NSA Scholarship Foundation is a 501(c)(3) tax-exempt organization that relies on voluntary, tax-deductible contributions to support its programs. A Board of Trustees holds full fiduciary responsibility for managing the Foundation and its programs. Each year, thousands of students contact the NSA seeking help to meet the ever-increasing costs of higher education. In response, the Foundation provides financial encouragement to promising accounting students across the country, awarding scholarships to undergraduates enrolled in a degree program at an accredited two- or four-year college or university. Applicants are judged on the basis of scholastic achievement, demonstrated leadership ability, and financial need. In 2015, the Foundation awarded $45,875 to 39 students.

== Accreditation council ==
In 1973, NSA established the Accreditation Council for Accountancy and Taxation (ACAT) as an independent credentialing body to provide a standard of competency in the field of public accounting. The Council seeks to identify professionals in independent practice who specialize in providing financial, accounting, and taxation services to individuals and small- to mid-sized businesses. Professionals receive accreditation through examination and maintain it through a commitment to a significant program of continuing professional education and adherence to the Council's Code of Ethics and Rules of Professional Conduct.

ACAT offers four credentials to candidates:

- Accredited Business Accountant/Advisor (ABA)
- Accredited Tax Preparer (ATP)
- Accredited Retirement Advisor (ARA)
- Accredited Tax Advisor (ATA)

ABA and ATP credential holders are exempt from the Annual Federal Tax Refresher Course and testing requirements, automatically qualify for the Annual Filing Season Program Record of Completion (with a valid PTIN, CPE, and Circular 230), and are included in the IRS public Registered Tax Return Preparer Directory.
