= Greg LaFollette =

Greg LaFollette is a CPA, CGMA, and an AICPA credentialed CITP (Certified Information Technology Professional) in Sioux Falls, SD., the president and CEO of LaFollette Consulting LLC. He travels nationally as a consultant and conference speaker on the topic of technology in accountancy, his acknowledged area of expertise.

== Biography ==
After completing his professional accountancy training at Augustana College (South Dakota), LaFollette began his career in accounting by joining a regional firm in 1976. He became a CPA in 1978, and in 1980 he and his two partners bought the firm, which then became LaFollette, Jansa, Brandt & Co.

LaFollette embraced computer technology early in his career, and began writing a column in 1984 for a small publication called the CPA Software News, which would eventually grow into the CPA Technology Advisor. In 1986 he was offered and accepted a position on the Thomson Reuters Creative Solutions Advisory Board. In 1998 he left public practice to join the executive team of Thomson Reuters when he accepted the position of Vice President of Product Strategy.

Greg LaFollette was committee chair of the AICPA CITP Credential Committee (2004 - 2009), served on the AICPA's Top Technologies Task Force (2001-2005), and the AICPA Tech+ planning committee (2000-2009). He was a very early adopter of webcasting and podcasting, and is currently a member of the Subject Matter Panel on Technology for the Journal of Accountancy, and editor-in-chief of The Tech Gap, an accounting technology blog that he launched in 2003 (see external links).

In 2004, LaFollette left Thomson Reuters to begin a private consulting practice. He was approached by Cygnus Business Media and accepted the position as Executive Editor of the CPA Technology Advisor, which is co-branded as an official publication of the National Society of Accountants. He served as the Executive Editor of the CPA Technology Advisor (now known as the CPA Practice Advisor) from 2004 to 2009.

In 2009 he left the CPA Technology Advisor. In 2010 he accepted a position as VP Product Strategy with CPA2Biz, a subsidiary of the American Institute of CPA's. That same year, LaFollette was named as one of Accounting Technology's Top 25 Thought-Leaders. In February, 2011 he was named to the CPA Practice Advisor's “Hall of Fame”.

As of 2014, he has retired from practice, but continues to consult and speak at conferences. He currently serves as chair of the Board of Ethics for the city of Sioux Falls, SD.
