= Registered Tax Return Preparer =

Category of federal tax return preparers

A Registered Tax Return Preparer is a former category of federal tax return preparers created by the U.S. Internal Revenue Service (IRS).

In January 2013, the IRS announced the suspension of the program because of a ruling on January 18, 2013, by Judge James E. Boasberg of the United States District Court for the District of Columbia. As a result of a lawsuit, the Court issued an order prohibiting the IRS from enforcing the regulatory requirements for registered tax return preparers. In accordance with this order, tax return preparers covered by this program are not currently required to register with the IRS. The IRS announced that because of the Court's ruling, tax return preparers are not required to complete the competency testing or to secure the continuing education that had been required.

== History of Registered Tax Return Preparers ==
In 2010, the IRS announced that it would increase standards for return preparers and institute testing and continuing education requirements. Prior to the IRS Return Preparer Initiative, anyone could call himself or herself a tax return preparer regardless of age, experience or training. The IRS conducted a series of public hearings with tax preparers, associations and consumer advocates. The result was the Return Preparer Review. The initiative required all tax return preparers to register with the IRS and to obtain a Preparer Tax Identification Number (PTIN). Some preparers were required to pass a competency test and to complete 15 hours of continuing education credits annually. Exempt from the testing and CE requirements were Certified Public Accountants, attorneys and Enrolled Agents, because they already have testing and education requirements for their credentials. Also exempt were non-1040 tax return preparers and non-signing preparers who are supervised by CPAs, attorneys or Enrolled Agents and work at firms 80 percent owned by CPAs, attorneys and Enrolled Agents. Tax preparation volunteers were exempt from all initiative provisions.

== Registered Tax Return Preparer requirements ==
To become a Registered Tax Return Preparer, a person was required to be age 18 or older, to register with the IRS, and to have a valid Preparer Tax Identification Number (PTIN). A Registered Tax Return Preparer was to have passed a competency test covering tax law issues, individual tax return preparation, and ethics. He or she was required to pass a tax compliance check conducted by the IRS. To maintain the designation, a Registered Tax Return Preparer was required to complete 15 hours of continuing education courses each year, and to renew his or her PTIN annually. Finally, the Registered Tax Return Preparer was required to adhere to ethical standards set out by the Department of Treasury's Circular 230.

The first certificates for Registered Tax Return Preparers were issued in March 2012.

=== Exemptions from the Tax Return Preparer Requirements ===
For certain professionals such as those already enrolled to practice before the IRS, CPAs, and tax attorneys, the scope of the exemption from the testing and annual continuing education requirements was clear. For others who did not possess a designation, the facts and circumstances determined whether or not the practitioner was required to become a Registered Tax Return Preparer. This exemption did not eliminate the need for all tax return preparers to obtain a PTIN (preparer tax identification number).

To qualify as a non-Form 1040 series preparer, a tax return preparer could not receive compensation for the preparation or assistance with, any Form 1040 series tax return or claim for refund, except a Form 1040-PR or Form 1040-SS. A non-Form 1040 series tax return preparer was allowed to sign any other tax return he or she prepared. A non-1040 series preparer was required to obtain a PTIN (preparer tax identification number) from the IRS, and to certify annually upon renewal that he or she did not prepare Form 1040 series tax returns.

An important characteristic of a supervised preparer was that the individual could not sign, or be required to sign, tax returns as a paid return preparer. At least 80 percent of the firm that employs the supervised preparer was required to be owned by attorneys, CPAs, or enrolled agents. A supervised preparer was required to be supervised by an attorney, CPA, enrolled agent, enrolled retirement plan agent, or enrolled actuary who signs the returns prepared by the supervised preparer.

Non-Form 1040 Series Preparers and Supervised Preparers were exempt from IRS competency testing and continuing education requirements. Non-1040 series preparers and supervised preparers were not allowed to identify themselves as a Registered Tax Return Preparer or as a Circular 230 practitioner.

=== Registered Tax Return Preparer Test ===
Prior the program's suspension, the Registered Tax Return Preparer Test was used as a minimum competency exam intended for return preparers to demonstrate basic proficiency in U.S. tax law, tax return preparation and ethics. It was a 120-question exam timed at 2.5 hours. Preparers who were required to pass the test had until December 31, 2013.

=== Continuing Education ===
Prior to the suspension of the program in January 2013, Registered Tax Return Preparers and RTRP candidates were required to complete 15 hours of continuing education annually. They were required to have 10 hours of general federal tax law, 3 hours of tax law updates and 2 hours of ethics. These continuing education courses were required to be taken from IRS-approved continuing education providers. Preparers who had a RTRP test requirement also had a continuing education requirement, even if they had not yet taken the test.

=== Ethics and Tax Compliance ===
Under the program, ethical requirements that previously applied only to CPAs, attorneys and Enrolled Agents also applied to all paid return preparers. All tax professionals also were to undergo a tax compliance check and were subject to the standards for practice outlined in Treasury Department Circular 230.

== Services provided ==
Registered Tax Return Preparers were allowed to prepare and sign federal tax returns for individuals. They had limited authority to represent taxpayers before the Internal Revenue Service. RTRPs were allowed to represent clients before revenue agents, customer service representatives, or similar officers and employees of the IRS (including the Taxpayer Advocate Service) during an audit if they signed the tax return or claim for refund for the tax period under examination.

By comparison, CPAs, attorneys and Enrolled Agents have unlimited representation rights before the IRS. They may represent taxpayers at any stage of an audit, collection or appeals process.

== Suspension of the program ==
In January 2013, the IRS issued the following announcement:

As of Friday, Jan. 18, 2013, the United States District Court for the District of Columbia has enjoined the Internal Revenue Service from enforcing the regulatory requirements for registered tax return preparers. In accordance with this order, tax return preparers covered by this program are not currently required to register with the IRS, to complete competency testing or secure continuing education. The ruling does not affect the regulatory practice requirements for CPAs, attorneys, enrolled agents, enrolled retirement plan agents or enrolled actuaries.

The Internal Revenue Service, working with the Department of Justice, continues to have confidence in the scope of its authority to administer this program. On Wednesday, Jan. 24, the IRS and Justice Department asked for the injunction to be lifted. Regardless of the outcome of that request, an appeal is planned within the next 30 days

The IRS is continuing to evaluate the scope of the court's order in determining consistent next steps......

== See also ==
Annual Filing Season Program
