= The Progressive Accountant =

American ezine for the accounting industry

The Progressive Accountant is an ad driven online ezine oriented exclusively to the accounting industry. It is run from the Progressive Media Group's main office in Middletown, New Jersey, USA and provides news and information in real time. The Progressive Accountant offers podcasts, libraries of white papers about firm marketing and technological operations, a software demo page for accounting firms, and Continuing Professional Education, or CPE, webinars.

== Owner ==
The Progressive Accountant is owned and operated by a business-to-business (B2B) publishing group called Progressive Media Group. They manage several similar online publications including Non-Profit Technology News, The Progressive Physician, Bob Scott's Insights, Non-Profit Career Fair, and Medical Jobs World.

== History ==
The Progressive Accountant was founded as an S corporation in 2006. The company officers immediately approached the Editor-in-Chief of their largest established competitor, Greg LaFollette, CPA of the CPA Technology Advisor, and offered him a position. Lafollette was impressed with The Progressive Accountant's business model of a printless magazine, and believing that printed content delivery was becoming obsolete he accepted the position of Editor in Chief. The Progressive Accountant title quickly drew a number of major advertisers like CCH, Thomson Reuters, ADP Payroll, and Accountant's World. In 2009 the Executive Editor position was taken over by Bob Scott, the former Editor in Chief of Accounting Technology Magazine which had been merged into Accounting Today.

== People ==
=== Staff ===
The company still retains all of its founding officers. Kurt Martin is the Group Publisher, Ara Boyadjian holds the position of Director of Operations, and Patrick O'Leary is Associate Publisher.

=== Contributors ===
Major contributors include:

- John Anderson, CPA.CITP, CIA, MCP, MSA of WSR&B Information Technology Services Group
- Amy Vetter, CPA/CITP, MBA: Accounts Manager, for Intuit (Southeastern Region). Former Senior Financial Analyst at Ryder System, Inc. Recipient of numerous awards including the CPA Technology Advisor's "40 under 40" awards.
- Hugh Duffy: Co-Founder of Build Your Firm, Inc.
- Jim Bourke CPA.CITP: Director of Firm Technology, Board member, and Management Committee member at WithumSmith+Brown, PC. Awarded "Top 100 Most Influential people in Accounting" by Accounting Today Magazine in 2008.
- William C. Fleenor CPA.CITP, PhD: Contributing author for the Journal of Accountancy, the CPA Journal, and many other professional journals. Former chair of the AICPA Information Technology Conference. Recipient of numerous awards including the AICPA"Louisiana Accounting Educator of the Year".
- Jack LaRue: Senior Vice President of Thompson Reuter's myPay Solutions.
