= AFSP =

AFSP may refer to:

- Annual Filing Season Program, the US IRS continuing education program for tax return preparers
- American Foundation for Suicide Prevention
