= CPA Magazine =

CPA Magazine is a tax and technology resource for accounting and tax professionals delivered in online digital, email and print versions. The headquarters of the magazine is in Southlake, Texas.

== Summary ==
CPA Magazine was founded in 2002 by editor/publisher T. Steel Rose, CPA. Rose founded The CPA Software News, now known as CPA Practice Advisor in 1991.

Along with its website, CPA Magazine is a print and online tax and technology resource for practicing CPAs, EAs and tax professionals. Each issue provides Tax oriented Continuing Professional Education (CPE) for its readers.

Both online and print content of CPA Magazine is focused on tax strategies and comparative reviews of tax and technology solutions for tax and accounting practices. Reviews include new features and quotes from users.

== Ownership ==
CPA Magazine is a publication of Abide Media.

== Circulation ==
CPA Magazine has a print circulation of approximately 20,000 certified public accountants (CPA), enrolled agents (EA), and tax professionals in public practice. Online metrics note more than 84,974 impressions per month (average: 2013–2014).

== Executive Editor ==
Executive Editor Sidney Kess is author of hundreds of tax books. The American Institute of CPAs established the Sidney Kess Award for Excellence in Continuing Education. Kess is best known for lecturing to over 700,000 practitioners on tax before the advent of the Internet.

== Editorial focus ==
CPA magazine is circulated as an independent tax publication for practicing CPAs featuring interviews with the top IRS Commissioners and the IRS Taxpayer Advocate.

CPA Magazine honors are presented to practicing CPAs for timely contributions to the profession including Top 50 Practitioners, Most Influential CPAs, and Top 50 Practitioner Solutions.

The technology and accounting software reviews in CPA Magazine include the latest installed products offered by companies such as Thomson Reuters, CCH, TaxAct, OfficeTools, AccountantsWorld, and BQE. Reviews and articles are written by practicing CPAs.

== Columnists ==
- Tax Strategy Advisor (Executive Editor, Sidney Kess, CPA, JD, LL.M)
- Financial Planning Advisor (Jerry Love, CPA/PFS, CFP, CVA, ABV, CITP, CFF, CFFA)
- IRS Representation Advisor (E. Martin Davidoff, CPA, JD)
- Social Security Advisor (T. Steel Rose, CPA)
- Estate Planning Advisor (Martin M. Shenkman CPA/PFS, MBA, JD)
- Client Tax Tip (Julie Welch, CPA, CFP)
