= Florida Board of Accountancy =

Board that regulates Accounting in Florida, US

The Florida Board of Accountancy (FLBOA) regulates Certified Public Accountants and Certified Public Accounting Firms for the State of Florida. The FLBOA is created in Florida Statutes Chapter 473 and is administered by the Florida Department of Business and Professional Regulation (DBPR). Florida Statutes Chapter 473 permits the FLBOA to establish rules that are codified in the Florida Administrative Code (FAC) in sections 61H1-19 through 61H1-39.

== Composition ==
The FLBOA members are appointed by the Governor of the State of Florida and confirmed by the Florida Senate. There are nine members, seven are licensed CPAs and two are public members who are not and have never been a CPA.

== Roles ==
The FLBOA has three main functions:

- Administering applications to sit for the CPA Examination and applications for licensure
- Disciplining licensees
- Approving rules in the FAC and changes to the FAC

All current and past members of the FLBOA are members of the National Association of State Boards of Accountancy (NASBA).

== Licensing ==
The Florida Board of Accountancy handles applications to sit for the Uniform CPA Examination. The requirements to take the Uniform CPA Examination include:

- Completion of 120 semester hours of college credit, including 24 semester credit hours of upper division accounting courses,
- Complete a form disclosing: 1) whether you have a criminal record, 2) whether any judgement or open investigation relating to accounting, 3) whether you have ever had a professional license application denied, 3) whether you have ever had a professional license disciplined, and 5) whether you have ever been denied the right to sit for the CPA Examination.

The Florida Board of Accountancy also handles applications for licenses for individual license to practice public accounting. The requirements for individual licensure include:

- Pass the Uniform Accountancy Examination,
- Completion 150 semester hours of college credit from an accredited university, with certain specific required courses including 30 semester hours in upper division accounting courses and 36 semester hours in upper division general business courses, and
- Completion of the equivalent of one year of work.

The Florida Board of Accountancy also handles applications for firm licenses. Firms are required to have a Firm license if they

- Have an office in Florida that conducts audits, or
- Have a name that includes CPA or a similar designation.

Firms without an office in Florida may practice in Florida without a license, if

- It is enrolled in Peer Review, and
- Meets Firm structure requirements.

== Discipline ==
Florida's disciplinary system is complaint based. All complaints are administered on a confidential basis. Complaints are presented to a Probable Cause Panel to determine if there is probable cause that there is a violation of Florida Statutes or Administrative Code. If no probable cause is not found or if the Probable Cause Panel issues a letter of guidance in lieu of a finding of probable cause, the matter is closed and remains a confidential issue. If probable cause is found, the matter is made public and brought before the Board at a Public Meeting. Discipline is considered and if approved is evidenced through a Final Order.

== Rulemaking ==
The Florida Board of Accountancy is authorized by Florida Statutes Chapter 455 Professions and Chapter 473 Public Accountancy. These laws establish authority to create the Board of Accountancy and create, amend and repeal administrative rules. The Administrative Rules are contained in the Florida Administrative Code, Chapter 61H1-19 thru 39. The provisions of these rules may be temporarily or permanently waived by a majority vote of the Board.

Affected persons, or licensees, may request the Board of Accountancy make a "Declaratory Statement" interpreting how the Board will rule on a matter in advance. The licensee must provide specific facts and circumstances and the Declaratory Statement only applies to those specific facts and circumstances. The most recent Declaratory Statement covered accounting and tax services provided to companies in the marijuana industry.

On January 31, 2019, Governor Ron DeSantis convened a "Deregathon" for Florida Regulatory Boards. Also attending were Lieutenant Governor Jeanette Nuñez and DBPR Secretary Halsey Beshears. The purpose of the Deregathon was to begin the process of reducing unnecessary regulations facing Floridians with a goal to strengthen the state's economy. The Florida Board of Accountancy participated in the event and identified several issues impacting Statutes, Administrative Rule and policy. With a regularly scheduled Board meeting the following day, the BOA began rulemaking on issues identified in the Deregathon.

== History ==
Florida Governor Napoleon B. Broward signed the Florida Accountancy Act in 1905, beginning the regulation of the public accounting profession in 1905. The Act began both the regulation of CPA's and the regulation of unlicensed activity in Florida. In 1927, Florida prohibited the use of "public accountant" by nonlicensees. In 1937, the Board used that power to prohibit the use of "public accountant" in the case Abess v. Heller. The courts granted the injunction and Heller appealed leading to the Florida Supreme Court decision in 1938 upholding the ability to license unregulated activity. The Florida Supreme Court narrowed the ability of the Board of Accountancy to limit unlicensed activity in the 1957 case Florida Accountants Association v. Dandelake. The court ruled that unlicensed activity could only be limited if the accountant used the title CPA or PA or if the public was confused in the title of a CPA and a non-CPA. The Accountancy Act was changed in 1969 to remove the restriction of non-CPAs practicing public accounting, recognizing that many accounting activities could be performed by non CPAs so long as the public was not confused.

National firms enter Florida

The movement towards national and international enterprises who relied on larger CPA firms and more national and international CPA firms led to problems in Florida. The Florida regulations required that all partners and CPAs be licensed in Florida. Other than three firms grandfathered in before the licensing requirements, CPA firms would need to obtain a temporary license for each engagement because even one partner in another state who did not have a Florida CPA license could prevent a Firm from being licensed in Florida. Two cases heard by the Florida Supreme Court, Mercer v. Hemmings (1964 and 1966), limited the ability of the State to restrict national firms from practicing in Florida. The election in 1967 of Florida Governor Claude Kirk, the first Republican governor since reconstruction, a progrowth governor resulted in the appointment of Board of Accountancy members who favored allowing national firms to practice in Florida. R. Bob Smith, on behalf of the national firms, led an effort to separate the Board of Accountancy (a Florida Regulatory body) and the Florida Institute of Certified Public Accountants (a membership organization representing the CPA profession). In 1967, Clifford Beasely was the executive director of both entities. Mr. Beasley remained the FICPA executive director and Douglas Thompson, an auditor with the Auditor General of the State of Florida, became the executive director of the Board of Accountancy. In 1969, the Accountancy Act was amended to permit national firms to practice public accounting in Florida. The last impediment to national firms practicing public accounting in Florida was the requirement that all partners be CPAs, limiting the ability for firms with Tax and Consulting partners who were not licensed CPAs. in 1997, the Board of Accountancy Act was amended to require only a majority of partners be licensed CPAs.

Continuing professional education

In 1969, the American Institute of Certified Public Accountants recommended mandatory continuing professional education (CPE) to improve quality in the profession. Following this movement, in 1973 Florida enacted a law requiring 90 hours of continuing professional education every three years. Statutory changes over the next 30 years led to the current law passed in 2004 requiring 80 hours of continuing professional education every two years. In 2009, Chapter 473 was amended to require 4 CPE hours in Ethics replacing of a previous requirement for licensees to take and pass a laws and rules examination. In 2019, the Florida enacted legislation reducing the required Accounting and Auditing from 20 hours to 8 hours every two years.

Increasing college credit from 120 hours to 150 hours

Also in 1969, the American Institute of Certified Public Accountants recommended additional education beyond the bachelor's degree as a requirement for licensure. Over the next ten years, Florida discussed increasing the number of college credits required for licensure. In 1979, the State of Florida enacted the 150 hour requirement, becoming only the second state to enact such requirement. The requirement was phased in beginning in 1984. Ultimately, all 50 states would follow and the 150 hour requirement of college credit is now the standard for the profession in the United States.

Advertising by CPAs

During the 1990s, Florida was a party in two US Supreme Court cases shaped the way the CPA profession was regulated.

- The first case began in 1991 when a CPA and attorney, Syvia Ibanez, advertised that she had a law firm that did tax and estate planning. While she was a licensed CPA, the law firm was not licensed and her advertisement included reference to another certification by an entity not recognized by the Board. The Board disciplined Ibanez for "false, deceptive, and misleading" advertising and the lower court upheld the discipline in 1993. In 1994, in Ibanez v. Florida Board of Accountancy the US Supreme Court overturned the lower court's decision and struck down the restrictions on "certified" unless they were in fact misleading.
- The second case began in 1994 with Stephen Miller who was at the time working for American Express Tax and Business Services. American Express Tax and Business Services was not a licensed firm and advertised that Miller was a CPA. Florida regulations prohibited a non licensed firm from advertising that included reference to a CPA. Miller and American Express Tax and Business Services were disciplined by the Board of Accountancy. The lower courts overturned the discipline and the US Supreme Court agreed to hear the case in 1997 in a case titled Stephen Miller, American Express Tax and Business Services v. George Stuart, Florida Department of Business and Professional Regulation, et al. The case centered around whether a CPA and a nonlicensed firm they worked for could advertise that they were licensed CPA. The US Supreme Court let stand the lower court ruling that Miller and American Express could advertise that Miller was a CPA even though American Express was not a licensed firm on the grounds that restricting truthful statements was a violation of the First Amendment's Freedom of Speech. In response, Florida changed its Accountancy Act to restrict what CPAs may do and not restricting how and under what circumstances they call themselves CPAs.

Peer Review

Peer Review began as a concept in the 1960s as a way of self-regulation of the CPA profession, where peer CPA's would review the CPA practice of another CPA and conclude on whether CPA was following standards. in 1972, the American Institute began a program to review firms who audited public companies. US congressional hearings to determine if government oversight of the profession resulted in the 1976 Metcalf Report "The Accounting Establishment". In 1988, the American Institute made Peer Review a Mandatory requirement for Firm membership. Several states began requiring Peer Review as a condition for licensure. Two famous accounting scandals in 2001 and 2002 (Enron and WorldCom) would lead to the 2002 enactment of the Sarbanes-Oxley Act (SOX). SOX would replace Peer Review for public company auditors with a structure for government inspections of CPA firms. Florida was slow to enact any Peer Review legislation. Finally in 2013, Florida became the 49th state to enact Peer Review legislation. Florida's Peer Review statute only requires enrollment in a Peer Review program and does not require completion of a Peer Review.

Peer Review was first designed as a process to improve practices of CPA firms and the original intent was to be rehabilitative in nature. As such, generally, the peer review reports are used as a basis for discipline. Some states have gone beyond the original intent and required CPA firms to provide Peer Review reports to their State Accountancy Board, posted Peer Review Reports on public websites or used the issuance of multiple failed Peer Reviews as a basis for discipline. Also, the Governmental Accountability Office has issued the Yellow Book, which requires CPA Firms that issue audit reports on financial statements or performance audit reports to provide their Peer Review report to the client prior to commencing the audit.

Executive directors

The executive director of the Florida Board of Accountancy shared the position of the executive director of Florida Institute of Certified Public Accountants at its inception until 1968:

- Roger Scarborough, Division Director, Division of Certified Public Accounting (2019–present)
- Angela Francis, Acting Division Director, Division of Certified Public Accounting (2019)
- Veloria Kelly, Division Director, Division of Certified Public Accounting (2006–2019)
- John Johnson, Division Director, Division of Certified Public Accounting (2002–2006)
- Martha Willis, Division Director, Division of Certified Public Accounting (1980–2002)
- Cleve Nolte, executive director, Board of Public Accountancy
- Douglas Thompson, executive director, Board of Public Accountancy
- Clifford Beasley, executive director, Board of Public Accountancy

Board members

The board members with terms of service are noted below. Also noted are terms as chair and vice chair.

- Tracy Keegan – consumer member (2014–current, chair 2019, vice chair 2018)
- Michelle Maingot, CPA (2017–current)
- Steven Platau, CPA (2017–current, chair 2021, 2022)
- William Benson, CPA (2020–current)
- William Blend, CPA (2020–current, vice chair 2021, 2022)
- Jason Lafser, CPA (2020–current)
- Brent Sparkman, CPA (2020–current)
- Shireen Sackreiter – consumer member (2020–current)
- Caridad Vasallo, CPA (2022-current)

Prior board members have included:

- Mindy Rankin, CPA (2016–2020, chair 2020)
- David Skup, CPA (2016–2020, vice chair 2020)
- Jesus Socorro, CPA (2016–2020, chair 2020, vice chair 2019)
- James Lane, CPA (2014–2017)*
- David Dennis, CPA (2011–2020, chair 2018, 2016, vice chair 2017, 2015)
- Martin "Bud" Fennema, CPA (2011–2020, chair 2017, vice chair 2016)
- Steve Vogel – consumer member (2011–2019, chair 2015, vice chair 2014)
- Eric Robinson, CPA (2010-2018)
- Steve Riggs, CPA (2008–2016, chair 2014)
- Cynthia Borders, CPA (2008–2016, chair 2012)
- Frederick "Rick" Carrol, CPA (2007-2010)
- Teresa Borcheck – consumer member (2006–2014)
- Maria Caldwell, CPA (2004–2016, chair 2008, 2011)
- Bill Durkin, CPA (2004–2014, chair 2013)
- David Tipton, CPA (2003–2011, chair 2006, 2007, 2010)
- Jim Thielen, CPA (2003–2007, chair 2007)
- John Quinlan – consumer member (2001–2010)
- Robert Benz, CPA (2001-2004)
- Marshall Gunn, CPA (2001-2009, chair 2009)
- Susan McKinley (2001-2004)
- Frank Puissegur, CPA (2001-2004, chair 2004)
- Carol Wilson (2000-2001)
- Byron Shinn, CPA (1999-2003, chair 2000 and 2002)
- Lordes Boue (1999-2003)
- Tanya Davis (1999-2004, chair 2003)
- Charles Calhoun, CPA (1991-2001, chair 2001)
- Mirtha Martin, CPA (1998-2001, chair 1998)
- Steve Oscher, CPA (1996-2003, chair 1999)
- David McNamara, CPA (1996-2000)
- Jose Rodriguez, CPA (1995-2000)
- Andrea Spottswood, CPA (1995-1999)
- Dale Taylor (1995-2000)
- Malcolm R. Duggan, CPA (1995-1999)
- Shaun Davis, CPA (1995-1999)

*Deceased during term

== Accountancy license mobility ==
The Florida Board of Accountancy has adopted both individual mobility for CPAs and firm mobility for CPA Firms.

Individual mobility

NASBA and the AICPA changed the Uniform Accountancy Act in 2007 to encourage mobility of CPA licenses. The concept of mobility allows a CPA to be licensed in its Home State and then to practice as a CPA in other states without completing the unique regulatory requirements of the other states. The principle of mobility is based on three things: 1) no notice requirement of the non home state, 2) no fee paid to the non home state, and 3) agreement to abide by the laws of the non home state and accepting jurisdiction of discipline of the non home state. Florida enacted Individual mobility in 2009. Hawaii is the only state yet to enact mobility.

Firm mobility

NASBA and the AICPA further changed the Uniform Accountancy Act in 2014 to encourage mobility of CPA Firm licenses. The concept of Firm mobility allows a CPA Firm to be licensed in states where it has a physical office to practice as a CPA Firm in other states without completing the unique regulatory requirements of the other states. CPA Firm mobility requires compliance with Peer Review requirements and CPA ownership requirements. Florida enacted Firm mobility in 2017. Approximately 26 have either enacted or are in the process of enacting Firm mobility.
