= Annual Filing Season Program =

Program overview
- Established: June 2014
- Participants: Tax Preparers
- Recognition: AFSP - Record of Completion
- Regulator: Internal Revenue Service (IRS)
- Headquarters: Washington D.C.

Contact
- Office: Return Preparer Office
- Address: SE:RPO, Room 3420/IR; 1111 Constitution Ave NW; Washington, DC 20224
- Phone: 202-317-7063
- PTIN Related Questions: 877-613-7846

Website
- www.irs.gov/Tax-Professionals/Annual-Filing-Season-Program

The Annual Filing Season Program (or AFSP) is a voluntary Internal Revenue Service (IRS) program designed to incentivize non-credentialed tax return preparers to participate in continuing education (CE) courses. Participants receive an Annual Filing Season Program - Record of Completion, which may be displayed to prospective clients as a way to stand out in the marketplace and to demonstrate tax knowledge and filing competency. AFSP participants can also opt to be listed in The Directory of Federal Tax Return Preparers with Credentials and Select Qualifications, a public information database on the IRS website.

== Program Background ==
On January 1, 2011, the Return Preparer Office launched the IRS Return Preparer Initiative. The purpose of the initiative was to improve taxpayer compliance and service by setting professional standards for and providing support to the tax preparation industry. During the first phase of the initiative, anyone who for compensation prepared or helped prepare any federal tax return or claim for refund was required to register with the IRS by obtaining a Preparer Tax Identification Number (PTIN). Other requirements for some tax preparers eventually included needing to pass the IRS Registered Tax Return Preparer Test and annually completing continuing education courses on federal tax law and ethics. Participants who successfully completed all requirements were given a new title: Registered Tax Return Preparer.

In January 2013, however, the Internal Revenue Service announced that it was suspending the program due to a ruling by the United States District Court for the District of Columbia. As the result of a lawsuit, the Court issued an order forbidding the IRS from enforcing the regulatory requirements for registered tax return preparers.

In June 2014, the Return Preparer Office unveiled a new voluntary program intended to encourage tax return preparers to participate in continuing education courses on an annual basis — the Annual Filing Season Program (AFSP). In exchange for participation in the program, tax preparers receive an Annual Filing Season Program - Record of Completion, which they can display to help stand out from the competition. Participants can also choose to be included in an online IRS public information database called The Directory of Federal Tax Return Preparers with Credentials and Select Qualifications, which taxpayers can use to help locate qualified tax preparers in their area beginning January 2015.

== Record of Completion Requirements ==
Unenrolled tax return preparers who wish to obtain a program record of completion must possess a valid PTIN and complete 18 hours of continuing education annually from an IRS approved continuing education provider. The 18 hours of CE must include:

- 6 hour Annual Federal Tax Refresher (AFTR) course
- 10 hours of federal tax law topics
- 2 hours of ethics

Because the program had not been introduced until mid 2014, the number of CE hours required for Filing Season 2015 was prorated to 11 hours. The amended requirements for Filing Season 2015 were:

- 6 hour Annual Federal Tax Refresher (AFTR) course
- 3 hours of federal tax law updates
- 2 hours of ethics
