= NAEA =

NAEA or Naea may stand for:

== Organisations ==
- National Association of Estate Agents, United Kingdom
- National Art Education Association, United States
- National Association of Enrolled Agents, United States, an association of tax advisors
- NAEA Energy Massachusetts LLC, associated with the West Springfield Generating Station, Massachusetts, United States

== People ==
- Asomua Naea (born 1969), Samoan boxer
- George Naea (died 1854), high chief of the Kingdom of Hawaii
- Naea Bennett (born 1977), Tahitian footballer
