= Office of Professional Responsibility (disambiguation) =

The Office of Professional Responsibility is the United States Department of Justice's division for investigating misconduct by its employees.

Office of Professional Responsibility may also refer to:

- Office of Professional Responsibility of the U.S. Bureau of Alcohol, Tobacco, Firearms and Explosives (ATF)
- Office of Professional Responsibility of the U.S. Customs and Border Protection (CBP)
- Office of Professional Responsibility of the U.S. Drug Enforcement Administration (DEA)
- Office of Professional Responsibility of the U.S. Federal Bureau of Investigation (FBI)
- Office of Professional Responsibility of the U.S. Federal Emergency Management Agency (FEMA)
- Office of Professional Responsibility of the U.S. Immigration and Customs Enforcement (ICE)
- Office of Professional Responsibility (IRS) of the U.S. Internal Revenue Service (IRS)
- Office of Professional Responsibility of the United States Marshals Service (USMS)
- Office of Professional Responsibility of the U.S. National Park Service (NPS)
