= Kurt Martin (disambiguation) =

Kurt Martin (1899–1975) was a German art historian.

Kurt Martin may also refer to:

- Kurt Mandelbaum (1904–1995), also known as Kurt Martin, German-British economist
- Kurt Martin (director), Australian filmmaker, writer and director of Moon Rock for Monday (2020)
- Kurt Martin (footballer) (1923–2006), Finnish footballer (soccer)
- Kurt Martin, a fictional character in American teen sitcom The Suite Life of Zack & Cody (2005–2008)
- Kurt Martin, American soccer player in the 2006 NCAA Division I men's soccer tournament
- Kurt Martin, American publisher of the ezine The Progressive Accountant
