= NATP =

NATP may refer to:

- National Agricultural Technology Project, India
- National Association of Tax Professionals, United States
- Network address and port translation
- New American Tea Party, United States
