= OPR =

OPR may refer to:

- Office of Planning and Research, an agency of the California government
- Office of Population Research, the oldest population research center in the United States
- Office of Professional Responsibility, part of the United States Department of Justice
- Office of Professional Responsibility (IRS), part of the United States Internal Revenue Service responsible for investigating suspected practitioner misconduct
- Office of Public Roads, a predecessor of the United States Federal Highway Administration
- Official Pattern Release, used by Trend Micro to refer to the definitions for their antivirus products
- Oregon Pacific Railroad (1880–94), in Oregon, United States
- Oregon Pacific Railroad (1997), in Oregon, United States
- Old Parochial Registers of the Church of Scotland
- Output Recordings, a British independent record label run by Trevor Jackson, between 1996–2006
- Outward Processing Relief, a 1989 U.K. statutory instrument
- Overall pressure ratio, the ratio of the stagnation pressure as measured at the front and rear of the compressor of a gas turbine engine
- Overland Park Regional Medical Center, a hospital in Overland Park, Kansas
- Overnight Policy Rate, an overnight interest rate set by Bank Negara Malaysia used for monetary policy direction
- Owner's project requirements, a foundational document for the design and commissioning of buildings; see New-construction building commissioning
- Rodrigues People's Organisation (Organisation du Peuple Rodriguais), a Mauritian political party
- P. Ravindhranath, an Indian politician known as OPR, the son of O. Panneerselvam (OPS)

== See also ==
- Operator (disambiguation)
