= National Association of Tax Professionals =

American professional organization

The National Association of Tax Professionals (NATP) is an organization in the United States that offers support, education, products, and research services to tax professionals. Its members provide tax preparation and planning assistance to over 11 million taxpayers.

== Publications ==
The NATP publishes:

- TAXPRO Weekly – Each week members receive this e-mail with information about tax alerts and news briefs.
- TAXPRO Monthly – A newsletter covering current events and exploring critical new developments in federal tax laws while providing explanations of tax laws and procedures, “how to” articles, and summaries of court cases and rulings.
- TAXPRO Journal – A quarterly magazine with articles on issues such as new tax acts, practical tax applications, retirement planning, and solutions to the day-to-day challenges of running a tax practice

== See also ==
- Tax advisor
- Certified Public Accountant
- Enrolled Agent
