= National Association of State Boards of Accountancy =

Accounting organization

- NASBA

Agency overview
- Headquarters: Nashville, Tennessee
- Agency executives: Ken Bishop, President and Chief Executive Officer; Colleen Conrad, CPA, Executive Vice President and Chief Operating Officer; Troy Walker, CPA, Chief Financial Officer; Dan Dustin, CPA, Vice President of State Board Relations; Alfonzo Alexander, Chief Relationship Officer and NASBA Center for the Public Trust President; Maria-Lisa Caldwell, Esq., Chief Legal Officer and Director of Compliance Service; Cheryl Farrar, Chief Information Officer
- Website: Official Website

The National Association of State Boards of Accountancy (NASBA) is an association dedicated to serving the 56 state boards of accountancy. These are the boards that regulate the accountancy profession in the United States of America.

There is one board for each of the 50 states, plus the District of Columbia, Puerto Rico, U.S. Virgin Islands, Guam, Northern Mariana Islands, and American Samoa.

== Structure of the U.S. accounting profession ==
In the United States, the designation of Certified Public Accountant (CPA) is granted at state level. Individual CPAs are not required to belong to the American Institute of Certified Public Accountants (AICPA), although many do.

NASBA acts primarily as a forum for the state boards themselves, as opposed to AICPA which represents CPAs as individuals.

== Role of NASBA ==
NASBA's primary role is to:

- Act as a forum for state boards to discuss issues of common concern
- Encourage reciprocal recognition of the CPA qualification between states
- Enable state boards to speak with one voice in dealing with AICPA, the Federal Government, and other stakeholders

NASBA is a member of the International Federation of Accountants.

== Uniform CPA Examination ==
Responsibility for the Uniform Certified Public Accountant Examination is shared between state boards of accountancy, the AICPA and NASBA:

- State boards of accountancy are responsible for assessing eligibility of candidates to sit for the CPA examination. Boards are also the final authority on communicating exam results received from NASBA to candidates.
- The AICPA is responsible for setting and scoring the examination, and transmitting scores to NASBA.
- NASBA maintains the National Candidate Database and matches score data received from the AICPA with candidate details. Most states offer online score reporting on NASBA's website at www.nasba.org. NASBA also maintains records for those who have passed the exam.

The AICPA and NASBA also coordinate and maintain mutual recognition agreements with foreign accountancy institutes. The only countries with such agreements include Australia, Canada, Hong Kong, Ireland, Mexico, Scotland, and New Zealand. Accountants from these countries who meet the specified criteria may be able to sit for the International Qualification Examination (IQEX) as an alternative to the Uniform CPA Exam. IQEX is also jointly administered by the AICPA and NASBA; however, state boards are not involved at the examination stage (only at licensure).

== Boards of Accountancy ==
List of United States Boards of Accountancy
State	Board
Alabama	Alabama State Board of Public Accountancy
Alaska	Alaska State Board of Public Accountancy
Arizona	Arizona State Board of Accountancy
Arkansas	Arkansas State Board of Public Accountancy
California	California Board of Accountancy
Commonwealth of the Northern Mariana Islands	CNMI Board of Accountancy
Colorado	Colorado State Board of Accountancy
Connecticut	Connecticut State Board of Accountancy
Delaware	Delaware State Board of Accountancy
District of Columbia	District of Columbia Board of Accountancy
Florida	Florida Board of Accountancy
Georgia	Georgia State Board of Accountancy
Guam	Guam Board of Accountancy
Hawaii	Hawaii Board of Public Accountancy
Idaho	Idaho State Board of Accountancy
Illinois	Illinois Board of Examiners
Illinois	Illinois Department of Financial And Professional Regulation Public Accountancy Section
Indiana	Indiana Board of Accountancy
Iowa	Iowa Accountancy Examining Board
Kansas	Kansas Board of Accountancy
Kentucky	Kentucky Board of Accountancy
Louisiana	State Board of Certified Public Accountants of Louisiana
Maine	Maine Board of Accountancy
Maryland	Maryland State Board of Public Accountancy
Massachusetts	Massachusetts Board of Public Accountancy
Michigan	Michigan State Board of Accountancy
Minnesota	Minnesota State Board of Accountancy
Mississippi	Mississippi State Board of Public Accountancy
Missouri	Missouri State Board of Accountancy
Montana	Montana State Board of Public Accountants
Nebraska	Nebraska Board of Public Accountancy
Nevada	Nevada State Board of Accountancy
New Hampshire	New Hampshire Board of Accountancy
New Jersey	New Jersey State Board of Accountancy
New Mexico	New Mexico Public Accountancy Board
New York	New York State Board for Public Accountancy
North Carolina	North Carolina State Board of CPA Examiners
North Dakota	North Dakota State Board of Accountancy
Northern Mariana Islands	Northern Mariana Islands Board of Accountancy
Ohio	Accountancy Board of Ohio
Oklahoma	Oklahoma Accountancy Board
Oregon	Oregon Board of Accountancy
Pennsylvania	Pennsylvania State Board of Accountancy
Puerto Rico	Puerto Rico Board of Accountancy
Rhode Island	Rhode Island Board of Accountancy
South Carolina	South Carolina Board of Accountancy
South Dakota	South Dakota Board of Accountancy
Tennessee	Tennessee State Board of Accountancy
Texas	Texas State Board of Public Accountancy
Utah	Utah Board of Accountancy
Vermont	Vermont Board of Public Accountancy
U.S. Virgin Islands	U.S. Virgin Islands Board of Accountancy
Virginia	Virginia Board of Accountancy
Washington	Washington State Board of Accountancy
West Virginia	West Virginia Board of Accountancy
Wisconsin	Wisconsin Accounting Examining Board
Wyoming	Wyoming Board of Certified Public Accountants

== See also ==
- American Institute of Certified Public Accountants
- Florida Board of Accountancy
- Florida Institute of CPAs
