= Office of Professional Responsibility (IRS) =

OPR
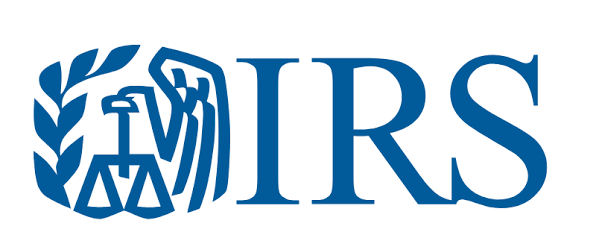

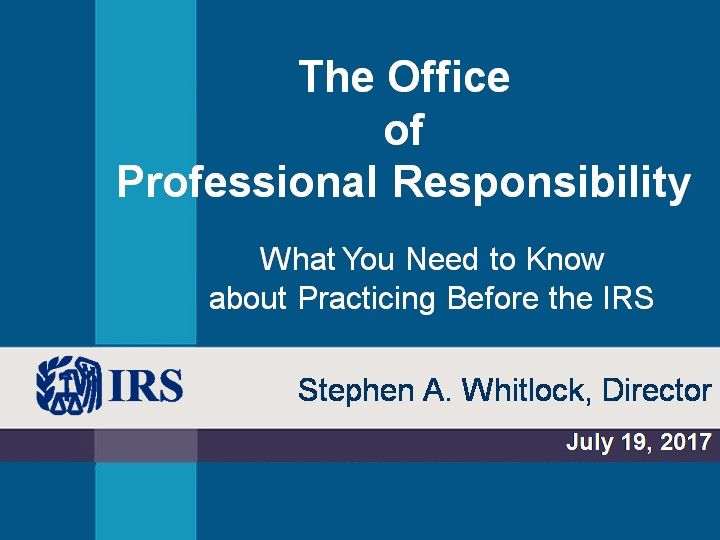

Agency overview
- Headquarters: Washington, DC
- Agency executive: Sharyn Fisk, Director
- Parent agency: IRS
- Website: https://www.irs.gov/tax-professionals/the-office-of-professional-responsibility-opr-at-a-glance

The Office of Professional Responsibility (OPR) at the U.S. Internal Revenue Service (IRS) is responsible for all matters related to "tax practitioner" misconduct, discipline and practice before the IRS under 31 CFR Subtitle A, Part 10 (Circular 230, Regulations Governing Practice before the Internal Revenue Service). A tax practitioner, sometimes referred to as a tax professional, is generally an attorney, CPA or enrolled agent.

OPR's vision, mission, strategic goals and objectives support effective tax administration by ensuring all tax practitioners, tax return preparers, and other third parties in the tax system adhere to professional standards and follow the law.

OPR's goals include the following: (1) Increase awareness and understanding of Circular 230 and OPR through outreach activities, (2) Apply the principles of due process to the investigation, analysis, enforcement and litigation of Circular 230 cases and (3) Build, train and motivate a cohesive OPR team.

OPR publishes all disciplinary actions in the Internal Revenue Bulletin (IRB). Published sanctions include censure, suspension or disbarment from practice before the IRS.

According to former OPR director Karen Hawkins, "The focus has been on roadkill - the easy cases of tax practitioners who are non-filers."

In FY 2018, OPR opened 2,672 new suspected practitioner misconduct cases.

== Referrals by IRS employees ==
OPR provides guidance and feedback to field/agency sources regarding essential referral criteria for each relevant Circular 230 provision.

Any IRS employee who believes a practitioner has violated any provision in Circular 230 is required to make a written report to the OPR (31 C.F.R. Section 10.53 (a)). Former OPR director Karen Hawkins encouraged IRS employees to make discretionary referrals because such referrals could expose a practitioner's pattern of behavior.

== Search for disciplined tax professionals ==
OPR's disciplinary look-up chart contains searchable information regarding censures of practitioners for Circular 230 misconduct and suspensions and disbarments of individuals from practice before the IRS.

The list contains basic information on over 3,000 OPR censures, suspensions, disbarments, and miscellaneous restrictions on practice, such as permanent injunctions and denials of limited practice to unenrolled tax return preparers due to misconduct. The list covers the last 25 years, which aligns with the OPR's record-retention requirement.

The list provides a practitioner's last name, first name, middle initial (if applicable), city, state, designation, disciplinary sanction, effective date, ending date (the practitioner is now in good standing and may represent taxpayers before the Service). The spreadsheet is searchable using the “Sort & Filter” and “Find & Select” features.

To report issues, concerns or any problems that you may experience contact the OPR at Internal Revenue Service, Office of Professional Responsibility, SE:OPR, Room 7238/IR, 1111 Constitution Avenue NW., Washington, DC 20224 or fax to #855-814-1722.

== Return Preparer Office ==
OPR targets questionable practices by tax return preparers and tax relief companies. Consumers can report problems to the IRS on Form 14157, Complaint: Tax Return Preparer. The IRS Return Preparer Office will process the complaint and, if appropriate, submit it to OPR for investigation.
