= Special Enrollment Examination =

Test administered by the Internal Revenue Service in the USA

The Special Enrollment Examination (or SEE) is a test that individuals can take to become an Enrolled Agent in the United States. The Enrolled Agent credential is conferred and regulated by the Internal Revenue Service (IRS). The exam consists of three parts:

- Part 1 – Individual
- Part 2 – Business
- Part 3 – Representation, Practice and Procedures

All of the questions on the examination are weighted equally, and the IRS grades the test on a bell curve. The test results are converted to a scale from 40-130, with 105 representing a passing score. Exam results can be seen immediately after completing the exam.

Each exam is weighted by section according to the following:

Part 1 – Individuals

- 15% Section 1: Preliminary Work and Tax Payer Data
- 25% Section 2: Income and Assets
- 25% Section 3: Deductions and Credits
- 20% Section 4: Taxation and Advice
- 15% Section 5: Specialized Returns for Individuals

Part 2 – Businesses

- 45% Section 1: Businesses
- 40% Section 2: Business Financial Information
- 15% Section 3: Specialized Returns and Tax Payers

Part 3 – Representation, Practices and Procedures

- 33% Section 1: Practices and Procedures
- 25% Section 2: Representation before the IRS
- 25% Section 3: Specific Types of Representation
- 17% Section 4: Completion of the Filing Process

The total time allowed for taking the 300 questions on the exam is 10.5 hours (i.e., 3.5 hours for each of the three parts, with each part containing 100 questions). Candidates who wish to schedule an exam need a Preparer Tax Identification Number (PTIN). To obtain a PTIN, the applicant must complete a W-12 by mail, fax or online at irs.gov. Examinations are administered by computer at Prometric testing centers. Currently, the Special Enrollment Examination is given at nearly 300 Prometric testing centers located across the United States and internationally. Test centers are located in most major metropolitan areas. Once the applicant has a PTIN, he or she may register for the exam online at www.prometric.com/irs.

Each section may be completed at the applicant's convenience. The parts do not have to be taken on the same day or on consecutive days. Each section can be taken up to four times in a testing window, and the score credit carries over for up to two years from the date of the examination. The testing window starts on May 1 every year, and ends at the end of February. There are no tests available during the months of March and April, at which time the exams are updated with the latest changes in the laws and the regulations. After passing all three parts of the exam, test takers may apply for enrollment to practice before the IRS. To apply, Form 23, Application for Enrollment to Practice Before the IRS, and a check for $67 should be submitted. An application may also be submitted online at the government payments site (pay.gov).
