= CPA Practice Advisor =

Practice management resource for accounting professionals

- Publisher: Barry Strobel
- Editor in Chief: Gail Perry, CPA
- Managing Editor: Isaac M. O'Bannon
- Categories: Accounting Technology Magazine, Accounting News, CPE and CE Provider for CPAs and Tax Pros, Digital Content, Streaming Content
- Frequency: 11 Issues per year; 6 Print, 11 Digital
- Circulation: 41,000
- First issue: April 1991
- Country: United States
- Based in: Nashua, New Hampshire
- Language: English
- Website: www.cpapracticeadvisor.com
- ISSN: 1550-4743

CPA Practice Advisor is a technology and practice management resource for accounting and tax professionals. It is offered in online digital and print versions, with six print issues per year (Feb, Apr, Jun, Aug, Oct, Dec) and 11 digital issues per year (Feb-Dec).

== History ==
The magazine was founded in 1991 as The CPA Software News; was renamed The CPA Technology Advisor in 2004, and was subsequently renamed CPA Practice Advisor in February 2011, with a stated purpose to "more closely align the publication and its digital offerings to the changing needs of the tax and accounting profession." The print version of the magazine is also distributed to certain professional organizations under the title NSA Practice Advisor (for the National Society of Accountants).

CPA Practice Advisor is a print and online technology media outlet for practicing public accountants and tax professionals. It covers technology issues as they relate to those professionals and their accounting practices, and to their interaction with small businesses and individual clients. The media outlet offers print, online and e-book versions of its print content, along with online tools, apps, podcasts and webcasts (which qualify for CPA-required Continuing Professional Education (CPE).

Online, streaming, print content and webinars offered by CPA Practice Advisor are focused on discussions, reviews and comparisons of technologies and workflow practices that can be beneficial to public tax and accounting practices that serve multiple clients. Additional content includes topical features, implementation advice and serial columns contributed by members of the professional accounting community, many of whom hold credentials as a CPA (Certified Public Accountants), CPA.CITP (CPAs with the additional qualification of Certified Information Technology Professional), EA (Enrolled Agent recognized by the IRS to represent taxpayers), member of the NSA (National Society of Accountants), or PA (Professional Accountant).

== Masthead ==
- Publisher: Barry Strobel
- Editor-in-Chief: Gail Perry, CPA
- Managing Editor: Isaac M. O'Bannon
- Senior Writer: Jason Bramwell
- Senior Operations Mgr: Stoney Thomas

== Circulation ==
CPA Practice Advisor has a print circulation of approximately 45,000 tax and accounting professionals, including credentialed Certified Public Accountants (CPA), Enrolled Agents (EA), Professional Accountants (PA) and others in the professional tax preparation and accounting spaces. Online metrics note more than 280,000 unique pageviews per month (Per Google Analytics, Feb 7, 2026).

== Content/Focus ==
The technology reviews in CPA Practice Advisor include coverage of the latest installed, hosted and cloud-based technologies offered by companies such as Avalara, Thomson Reuters, CCH, a Wolters Kluwer business, Intuit, Microsoft, Sage Software, AccountantsWorld, FreshBooks and Fujitsu. Reviews and articles are written by leading accounting technology thought leaders, including Editor-in-Chief Gail Perry, CPA, a practicing public accountant, author, and technology consultant for more than 30 years.

Website content is more news-focused with frequent updates on tax law, news from the Internal Revenue Service, accounting standards changes, regulatory rulings, labor management and HR reporting issues, and other small business topics. Regular columns include:

== Columns & Regular Features ==
- Apps We Love (Gail Perry, CPA, Editor-in-Chief),
- From the Trenches (Randy Johnston, MCS, MCP),
- The Staffing & HR Advisor (Paul McDonald),
- Bridging the Gap (Jim Boomer, CPA.CITP),
- The Millennial Advisor (Garrett Wagner, CPA.CITP),
- The Labor Law Advisor (Richard D. Alaniz),
- Technology IN Practice (Roman Kepczyk, CPA.CITP),
- Marketing Your Firm (Becky Livingston), and
- The Leadership Advisor (Amy Vetter, CPA.CITP, CGMA)

== CPE and CE Events and Accreditation ==
CPA Practice Advisor is accredited to provide continuing accounting, tax and audit professional education via live webinars and online live streaming educationally-focused events by the National Association of State Boards of Accountancy and the Internal Revenue Service.

== Special Events ==
CPA Practice Advisor sponsors several special events and programs, including its annual Tax & Accounting Technology Innovation Awards, which were founded in 2004 to recognize advances in technologies that benefit the tax and accounting space. Honors are also presented annually to professionals in the field through the publication's 40 Under 40 program. Additional programs and events include the annual Thought Leader Symposium, Accounting Hall of Fame, Most Powerful Women in Accounting Awards, and the Readers' Choice Awards. In addition, the magazine sponsors the annual live streaming CPA/CE conference Ensuring Success.
