= Circular 230 =

US Treasury Department rules publication

Circular 230 refers to Treasury Department Circular No. 230. This publication establishes the rules governing those who practice before the U.S. Internal Revenue Service (IRS), including attorneys, certified public accountants (CPAs) and enrolled agents (EAs).

The rules in Circular 230 also prohibit certain conduct. Penalties may be imposed for noncompliance. "Circular 230 is a hybrid document containing the rules, regulations, ethical/conduct provisions, and disciplinary procedures that apply to those who practice before the IRS." The rules in Circular 230 are codified as Title 31 of the Code of Federal Regulations, Subtitle A, Part 10 (31 C.F.R. Part 10).

== History ==
Circular 230 was first published in 1921. Some of its provisions became better known as a result of amendments made in 2005.

The statutory authority for Circular 230 was 31 U.S.C. § 330. That statute authorizes the IRS to “regulate the practice of representatives of persons before the Department of the Treasury.” 31 U.S.C. § 330(a)(1). The language now codified as Section 330 was originally enacted in 1884 as part of a War Department appropriation for “horses and other property lost in the military service.”

See, e.g., H.R. Rep. No. 82-2518, at 13 (1953); H.R. Rep. No. 89-1141, at 3 (1965) (“In imposing admission requirements on prospective practitioners, the Internal Revenue Service is acting under authority of the Act of July 7, 1884.”).

The Treasury’s practice rules “are designed to protect the Department and the public from persons unfit to practice before the IRS.”

== Applicability ==
Until the year 2011, anyone in the United States could legally engage in the business of preparing a federal tax return. The rules were changed effective January 1, 2011, and for a time imposed certain requirements on individuals engaging in the business of preparing U.S. federal tax returns. These new rules were struck down, however, by the U.S. District Court for the District of Columbia in the Loving case, a decision upheld by the U.S. Court of Appeals for the District of Columbia.

== Representing clients ==
In general, only attorneys, CPAs, enrolled agents, or enrolled actuaries or enrolled retirement plan agents may represent clients in proceedings before the IRS. Representing clients includes all communication with the IRS in regard to client matters without the client present. Exceptions permit unenrolled preparers to represent taxpayers during examination only for returns they prepared themselves. The rules permit family members to represent each other, employees to represent their employer, officers to represent corporations, and certain other types of representation.

== Key required actions for preparers ==
Persons preparing returns or giving tax advice must:

- Disclose on returns all nonfrivolous tax positions whose disclosure is required to avoid penalties.
- Return records to clients.
- Sign all tax returns they prepare.
- Provide clients a copy of tax returns.
- Advise clients promptly of errors or omissions of the preparer or client in any tax matter with respect to which the preparer is retained.
- Submit records, etc., requested by the IRS in a timely manner.
- Exercise due diligence and use best practices of the profession.

== Requirements for tax advice ==
In addition to the above, those giving tax advice must follow certain procedural rules in giving the advice. Written tax advice must not be based on unreasonable factual or legal assumptions or unreasonably rely upon representations of the client or others. It must consider all relevant facts and law.

== Key prohibited actions ==
Circular 230 contains rules of conduct in preparing tax returns. Persons preparing tax returns must not:

- Take a position on a tax return unless there is a realistic possibility of the position being sustained on its merits. Frivolous tax return positions are prohibited.
- Unreasonably delay prompt disposition of any matter before the IRS.
- Charge the client an "unconscionable fee" for representation.
- Represent clients with conflicting interests.
- Solicit business using false statements.
- Cash checks issued by the U.S. Treasury to a client for whom the return was prepared.

Section 10.27 of Circular 230 has traditionally included restrictions on contingent fee arrangements between taxpayers and their representatives. In July 2014, however, those restrictions were struck down by the U.S. District Court for the District of Columbia "with respect to the preparation and filing of Ordinary Refund Claims, where 'preparation and filing' precedes the inception of any examination or adjudication of the refund claim by the IRS and any formal legal representation on the part of the practitioner." The Court ordered that the government was permanently prohibited from enforcing the applicable restrictions in Circular 230.

Section 10.51 lists other types of misconduct including:

- Giving false or misleading information, or participating in any way in the giving of false or misleading information to the Department of the Treasury or any officer or employee thereof, or to any tribunal authorized to pass upon Federal tax matters, in connection with any matter pending or likely to be pending before them, knowing the information to be false or misleading. Facts or other matters contained in testimony, Federal tax returns, financial statements, applications for enrollment, affidavits, declarations, and any other document or statement, written or oral, are included in the term “information.”
- Contemptuous conduct in connection with practice before the Internal Revenue Service, including the use of abusive language, making false accusations or statements, knowing them to be false or circulating or publishing malicious or libelous matter.
- Directly or indirectly attempting to influence the official action of IRS employees by the use of threats, false accusations, duress, or coercion, or by offering gifts, favors, or any special inducements.

== Identifying ethical violations ==
According to a 2011 report by the Internal Revenue Service Advisory Council ("IRSAC") Office of Professional Responsibility ("OPR") Subgroup, Circular 230 sets forth ethical standards which are generally meant to apply to "willful" misconduct. Willful misconduct is generally described as "the intentional violation of a known legal duty." Willful misconduct is therefore distinguishable from misconduct which is merely negligent, mistaken or inadvertent. The Internal Revenue Manual recognizes this distinction by requiring that Internal Revenue Code Section 6694(a) ("understatement due to unreasonable positions") referrals to OPR be based upon a "pattern" of misconduct. A "pattern" of misconduct is the legally recognized sign or indicator of willfulness. Thus, according to IRSAC, Circular 230 is not intended to be utilized as an enforcement tool for isolated acts of incompetence or disreputable conduct. Instead, it is intended to more broadly protect the tax system from those practitioners who have demonstrated a clear pattern of failing to meet generally recognized standards of professional conduct.

== Reporting suspected misconduct ==
Any person other than an officer or employee of the Internal Revenue Service having information of a violation of any provision of Circular 230 may make an oral or written report of the alleged violation to OPR or any officer or employee of the Internal Revenue Service. If the report is made to an officer or employee of the Internal Revenue Service, the officer or employee will make a written report of the suspected violation and submit the report to OPR.

If an officer or employee of the Internal Revenue Service has reason to believe a practitioner has violated any provision of Circular 230, the officer or employee will promptly make a written report of the suspected violation on Form 8484, Report of Suspected Practitioner Misconduct. The report will explain the facts and reasons upon which the officer’s or employee’s belief rests and must be submitted to OPR. "Such reports are required by section 10.53(a) of the regulations governing practice, which are set out at 31 C.F.R. Part 10, and are published in pamphlet form as Treasury Department Circular No. 230."

== Sanctions ==
Tax preparers and advisers who violate Circular 230 may be subject to penalties. These include monetary penalties as well as potential suspension from practice before the IRS. The rules also provide procedures for disciplinary proceedings.

Periodically, the Internal Revenue Bulletin lists an announcement of disciplinary sanctions for the Office of Professional Responsibility.
