= National Association of Enrolled Agents =

The National Association of Enrolled Agents (NAEA) is an organization of enrolled agents (EAs) in the United States. Founded in 1972, it claims a membership of 11,000 EAs.

While its mission statement presents itself publicly as an advocate of taxpayer rights, its primary functions are educating tax professionals in best practices for representing taxpayers to the Internal Revenue Service (IRS), protecting the interests of the profession, and expanding the role of enrolled agents in both the public and private sectors.

== Requirements ==
Enrolled Agent status is required for NAEA membership, although EA status does not need to be active. Inactive/retired EA's may retain their membership. NAEA members have slightly higher Continuing Professional Education requirements than is normally required by the IRS to retain EA status.

== Continuing professional education ==
NAEA offers continuing professional education (CPE) webinars and seminars for EAs and presents a professional conference, the NTPI annually. The NTPI (National Tax Practice Institute) is a fellowship of NAEA members that meet very specific educational standards.

In addition to the CE Webinars, NAEA offers continuing education for tax professionals through the EA Journal.

== Scholarships ==
Each year the NAEA offers scholarships through the National Association of Enrolled Agents Education Foundation (NAEA-EF). The exact number and nature of these scholarships varies slightly from year to year but they are available to both practicing Enrolled Agents and tax professionals aspiring to the position.

== Organization ==
The NAEA is led by a board comprising two officers and twelve directors. In addition there are twelve independently chaired committees.

- Affiliate Council
- Audit Committee
- Awards Committee
- Bylaws Committee
- Education Committee
- Ethics and Professional Conduct Committee
- Government Relations Committee
- Nominating Committee
- NTPI 2010 Planning Committee
- PAC Steering Committee
- Public Awareness Committee
- Public Outreach Committee

== Accreditation ==
NAEA is recognized and approved by the Internal Revenue Service Office of Professional Responsibility (OPR) as a qualified sponsor of continuing professional education programs (Sponsor #16).
