= Statutory liability =

Statutory Liability is a legal term indicating the liability of a party who may be held responsible for any action or omission due to a related law that is not open to interpretation.

Although the term is a generic one and can apply to almost any field, it is typically used in finance as a reference in cases such as real estate transactions, shareholder obligations, or management behavior. It may also cover occupational health and safety laws, environmental laws, and employment laws. In some nations, such as New Zealand and Australia, business can purchase statutory liability insurance to protect from the fines and legal fees that can result from this breach.
