= Internal Revenue Bulletin =

- Type: Weekly publication
- Owner: Internal Revenue Service
- Founded: 1919; 107 years ago
- Language: English
- City: Washington, D.C.
- Website: www.irs.gov/irb

The Internal Revenue Bulletin (also known as the IRB), is a weekly publication of the U.S. Internal Revenue Service that announces "official rulings and procedures of the Internal Revenue Service and for publishing Treasury Decisions, Executive Orders, Tax Conventions, legislation, court decisions, and other items of general interest." It began publication in 1919.

The proper citation for an item in the IRB is "YYYY-II I.R.B. PPP." The IRS ceased publication of the Cumulative Bulletin with the 2008–2 edition. All the Cumulative Bulletins are posted on the United States Government Printing Office Federal Digital System.
