= Uniform Certified Public Accountant Examination =

Exam

The Uniform Certified Public Accountant Examination (CPA Exam) is the examination administered to people who wish to become Certified Public Accountants in the United States. The CPA Exam is used by the regulatory bodies of all fifty states plus the District of Columbia, Guam, Puerto Rico, the U.S. Virgin Islands and the Northern Mariana Islands.

The CPA Exam is developed, maintained, and scored by the American Institute of Certified Public Accountants (AICPA) and administered at Prometric test centers in partnership with the National Association of State Boards of Accountancy (NASBA).

== Exam content ==
The CPA Exam is a sixteen-hour exam tested in four separate sections. All candidates are required to take the same three core sections and a discipline section of their choice. As many as two sections can be taken in a given day or each section can be taken on separate days. A detailed overview of each exam is as follows:

=== Core sections ===
Auditing and Attestation (AUD)
Area		Allocation
Area I	Ethics, Professional Responsibilities and General Principles	15 - 25%
Area II	Assessing Risk and Developing a Planned Response	25 - 35%
Area III	Performing Further Procedures and Obtaining Evidence	30 - 40%
Area IV	Forming Conclusions and Reporting	10 - 20%

Financial Accounting and Reporting (FAR)
Area		Allocation
Area I	Financial Reporting	30 - 40%
Area II	Select Balance Sheet Accounts	30 - 40%
Area III	Select Transactions	25 - 35%

Taxation and Regulation (REG)
Area		Allocation
Area I	Ethics, Professional Responsibilities and Federal Tax Procedures	10 - 20%
Area II	Business Law	15 - 25%
Area III	Federal Taxation of Property Transactions	5 - 15%
Area IV	Federal Taxation of Individuals	22 - 32%
Area V	Federal Taxation of Entities (including tax preparation)	23 - 33%

=== Discipline sections ===
Business Analysis and Reporting (BAR)
Area		Allocation
Area I	Business Analysis	40 - 50%
Area II	Technical Accounting and Reporting	35 - 45%
Area III	State and Local Governments	10 - 20%

Information Systems and Controls (ISC)
Area		Allocation
Area I	Information Systems and Data Management	35 - 45%
Area II	Security, Confidentiality and Privacy	35 - 45%
Area III	Considerations for System and Organization Controls (SOC) Engagements	10 - 20%

Tax Compliance and Planning (TCP)
Area		Allocation
Area I	Tax Compliance and Planning for Individuals and Personal Financial Planning	30 - 40%
Area II	Entity Tax Compliance	30 - 40%
Area III	Entity Tax Planning	10 - 20%
Area IV	Property Transactions (disposition of assets)	10 - 20%

=== Scoring ===
With the exception of ISC, each section's score is weighted evenly between multiple-choice questions (MCQs) and tasked-based simulations (TBSs). ISC is instead weighted 60% on MCQs and 40% on TBSs. The exam is scored between 0 and 99 with a minimum of 75 being required to pass each section. Score calculation is based on if a question was answered correctly and the relative difficulty of the question.

=== Testing method ===
Candidates have a total of four hours to complete an exam, regardless of the number of questions or perceived difficulty. Each exam is broken out into 5 testlets. Candidates are permitted to take a break between testlets. However, with the exception of a standardized 15-minute break between testlets three and four, the exam timer is not paused. Each testlet is broken out in the table below:

Section	Time	MCQs		TBSs		
Section	Time	Testlet 1	Testlet 2	Testlet 3	Testlet 4	Testlet 5
AUD	4 hours	39	39	2	3	2
FAR	4 hours	25	25	2	3	2
REG	4 hours	36	36	2	3	3
BAR	4 hours	25	25	2	3	2
ISC	4 hours	41	41	1	3	2
TCP	4 hours	34	34	2	3	2

=== Exam disclosure ===
Due to the nature of the exam, the AICPA prohibits any exam candidate, former or current, from engaging in "irregular behavior" which the AICPA defines as disclosing exam content through means such as photography, writing, or memorization.

== Eligibility to sit for the exam ==
In order to sit for the Uniform CPA Exam, a person must be declared eligible to do so by one of the 55 state boards of accountancy in the United States. Requirements of state boards vary, but almost always include a U.S. bachelor's degree and a certain amount of accounting course credits. Additionally, some states require that candidates have completed an additional year of study (which can be either at an undergraduate or graduate level) before sitting for the exam and almost every state requires that the additional year of study be completed before awarding certification. The educational requirement equivalent to five years of full-time study is known as the "150-hour rule" (150 college semester units or the equivalent).

=== Fingerprint collection ===
The AICPA and NASBA mandate that exam candidates submit to a fingerprinting prior to each exam for identification purposes. According to published AICPA and NASBA reports, all fingerprints collected are immediately transmitted over the Internet to ChoicePoint/Reed Elsevier (Identico Systems) for storage.

=== Fees ===
Fees to sit for the Uniform CPA Exam vary by state.

=== Testing windows ===
As of July 1, 2020, Continuous Testing for the CPA Exam has been implemented, which means there are no longer any blackout periods where testing is not available. As of January 1st, 2024, this remains true only for core sections of the CPA Exam. Discipline sections are only available for roughly the first month of each quarter.

=== Failed sections ===
Where a candidate fails a section, it may be re-taken without any penalty other than a re-examination fee and the risk of credits for other sections expiring under the "30-month rule". Re-sitting for a failed section in the same testing window is not permitted. As of July 1, 2020, the AICPA has changed the rules and is now allowing for continuous testing, candidates can now re-test for the same section within the same quarter after receiving their failed score.

The 30-month clock starts on the date the first examination section passed was taken. If the remaining sections are not passed within the next 30 months (in states that have implemented the new 30-month expiration), you lose the credit for the first section and the next section passed becomes the target date.

=== Confidentiality ===
Since 1996, the Uniform CPA Exam has been a confidential examination. All persons involved with the Uniform CPA Exam, including candidates, must sign a confidentiality agreement not to disclose the contents of specific questions asked.

=== International Qualification Examination (IQEX) ===
Certain overseas qualified accountants may sit for the International Qualification Examination (IQEX). This is an alternative to the Uniform CPA Exam. As of 2018 this eligibility extends to the Institute of Chartered Accountants in Australia (ICAA), Chartered Professional Accountants of Canada (CPA Canada), Chartered Accountants Ireland (CAI), Institute of Chartered Accountants of Scotland (ICAS), Instituto Mexicano de Contadores Publicos (IMCP), Hong Kong Institute of Certified Public Accountants (HKICPA), New Zealand Institute of Chartered Accountants (NZICA), and CPA Australia.

=== Non-U.S. candidates ===
There is no specific bar to non-U.S. candidates sitting for the Uniform CPA Examination, however:

- It is possible to sit for the CPA Exam outside the USA but only in select country locations, which currently include Bahrain, Brazil, England, Ireland, Germany, Japan, Lebanon, Kuwait, Scotland, and the United Arab Emirates.
- Most states will accept non-U.S. education credentials, however they must normally be evaluated by a member of the National Association of Credential Evaluators. Some states prefer specific evaluators, such as Foreign Academic Credential Services or World Education Services, while the Illinois State Board of Accountancy prefers to conduct credential evaluations itself.
- Approximately one-third of the state boards require a candidate for the Uniform CPA Exam to be living or working in that state. However, the majority have no residence requirement.
- A few U.S. states (such as the Alabama State Board of Public Accountancy) require the candidate to be a U.S. citizen or Permanent resident (Green card holder), and at least 19 years of age.
- As of October 1, 2018, testing sites in select cities of England, Ireland, Scotland, and Germany began offering the CPA Exam to eligible candidates.

=== Review methods ===
There are a variety of ways to prepare for the CPA Exam. Many candidates use a CPA Review course that includes AICPA released multiple choice questions and task-based simulations. It is completely up to the candidate as to how they prepare for the CPA Exam.

== Pass rates ==
The CPA Exam is challenging with pass rates historically below 50%.

Uniform Certified Public Accountant Examination Pass Rates (2024 - Present)
Section	2024	2025	Average
AUD	45.79%	46.92%	46.36%
FAR	39.59%	42.66%	41.13%
REG	62.61%	62.89%	62.75%
BAR	38.08%	43.32	40.70%
ISC	58.00%	68.69%	63.35%
TCP	73.91%	78.57%	76.24%

Uniform Certified Public Accountant Examination Pass Rates (2006 - 2023)
Section	2006	2007	2008	2009	2010	2011	2012	2013	2014	2015	2016	2017	2018	2019	2020	2021	2022	2023	Average
AUD	44%	48%	49%	50%	48%	46%	47%	46%	46%	47%	46%	49%	51%	51%	53%	48%	48%	47%	48%
BEC	44%	47%	47%	48%	47%	47%	53%	56%	55%	56%	55%	53%	59%	60%	66%	62%	60%	57%	54%
FAR	48%	48%	49%	48%	48%	46%	48%	48%	48%	47%	46%	44%	46%	46%	50%	45%	44%	43%	47%
REG	42%	47%	49%	50%	51%	44%	48%	49%	49%	49%	48%	47%	53%	56%	62%	60%	60%	59%	51%

=== Elijah Watt Sells Award ===
The Elijah Watt Sells Award, named after Elijah Watt Sells, is awarded by the AICPA to high-performing CPA candidates who satisfy the following conditions:

- Have a cumulative average score above 95.50 on all three core sections and one discipline section.
- Pass four sections of the exam on the first attempt.
  - Failing any section of the exam once disqualifies a candidate from receiving this award.

== History of exam formats ==
Until the mid-1990s, the Uniform CPA Exam was 19.5 hours in duration and was administered over two and one-half days. It consisted of four subject areas (sections) which were tested in five sittings: Auditing (3.5 hours); Business Law (3.5 hours); Accounting Theory (3.5 hours); and Accounting Practice (Part I & Part II; 4.5 hours each). Although Accounting Practice Parts I and II were given in separate sittings, the two scores were combined for grading purposes. The exam was administered twice per year: on the first consecutive Wednesday, Thursday, and Friday in May and November of each year. Test takers were allowed to use only paper and pencil (no electronic calculators or computers of any kind were allowed at that time).

In 1994, the exam was restructured into a four-section, two-day exam. The subject matter was reorganized, primarily between Accounting Theory and Accounting Practice (Parts I and II). In addition, innovative machine-scorable test questions were incorporated to better assess the skills needed by CPAs to protect the public. For the first time, proprietary electronic calculators were provided to CPA candidates for the two new accounting sections. The four new sections were:

- Business Law and Professional Responsibilities
- Auditing
- Accounting and Reporting – Taxation, Managerial, and Governmental and Not-for-Profit Organizations
- Financial Accounting and Reporting – Business Enterprises

Until 1996, completely new versions of the CPA Exam were prepared and administered twice each year (May and November). After each administration, all questions and the keyed responses (correct answers) were published and available for purchase. Candidates were able to leave the test sites with their exam books, within certain time constraints imposed to preserve exam security. Beginning with the May 1996 administration, the exam became non-disclosed. Almost all exam material was now kept secure so that many high-quality questions could be reused. Although this is common practice in the world of large-scale testing, it was a policy decision that was momentous at the time, and made only after extensive comments were elicited from all key stakeholders, such as the 55 boards of accountancy, members of the CPA profession, accounting educators, CPA candidates, and testing professionals. By deciding to release only a small portion of each exam—to help candidates prepare for the examination experience high-quality exam material could be reused. This made it possible for the first time to use statistical techniques for test equating and to use criterion-referenced passing scores. Maintaining a large database of secure examination materials also made it possible for the CPA Exam to later transition to a computer-based administration format in 2004.

As of April 1, 2017, AICPA launched a new version of the Uniform CPA Exam. This updated version is the result of comprehensive research and places an increased emphasis on critical thinking, analytical ability, problem-solving and professional skepticism. The length of the exam increased from 14 to 16 hours with additional Task Based Simulations for each of the four sections. The Content Specification Outlines (CSOs) are replaced by Blueprints which will be released by AICPA each year. An additional change to the exam is an optional 15-minute break that will not count towards the 4-hour exam period.

On April 1, 2018, the AICPA rolled out new CPA Exam software that offers a more intuitive functionality. CPA candidates can practice with the software in advance of their actual test by using the AICPA's sample tests. The sample tests also include tutorial topics to guide candidates along with explanations of tools and resources.

In early 2019, the AICPA began a targeted practice analysis focused on the impact of technology and data analytics on the work of newly licensed CPAs as well core accounting skills that all CPAs must possess. After months of engaging with stakeholders from the profession, including supervisors of newly licensed CPAs, the AICPA published an Exposure Draft and Invitation to Comment. The Exposure Draft details major themes from the research along with proposed Exam content additions, changes, and deletions that will take effect sometime in 2021. The Invitation to Comment presents more future-oriented proposals that required further consideration and research. Both components of the report were posted for public comment on December 23, 2019.

On January 6th, 2024, the AICPA introduced a new version of the Uniform CPA Exam. This exam removed the Business Environment and Concepts (BEC) section and replaced it with three new sections:

- Business Analysis and Reporting (BAR)
- Information Systems and Controls (ISC)
- Tax Compliance and Planning (TCP)

This new format introduced these three new sections as "discipline sections" and the preexisting exam sections (AUD, FAR, and REG) became "core sections". Candidates are required to take all three core sections and one discipline section of their choice, for a total of four exams, under this new format.

== See also ==
- American Institute of Certified Public Accountants
- Certified Public Accountant (CPA)
- International Qualification Examination
- National Association of State Boards of Accountancy
