= Enrolled agent =

Type of tax practitioner in the United States

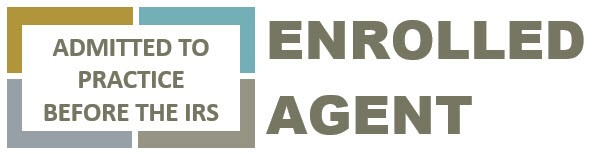
- Established: July 7, 1884
- Authorized by: Internal Revenue Service

In the United States, an enrolled agent (EA) is a tax advisor, specifically a federally authorized tax practitioner who, after passing a three-part Special Enrollment Examination, has been licensed and empowered by the Internal Revenue Service, a division of the United States Department of the Treasury. Enrolled agents, acting as attorneys-in-fact, may represent taxpayers before the IRS for any and all tax matters. This is in addition to providing traditional tax preparation, filing, and transmittal services.

Enrolled agent status is the highest credential awarded by the IRS. According to the National Association of Enrolled Agents, there are approximately 87,000 practicing EAs in the United States.

== History ==
The position of enrolled agent was created as a reaction to fraudulent war loss claims in the wake of the American Civil War with roots tracing back to the General Deficiency Act of July 7, 1884, or General Deficiency Appropriation Bill (H.R. 2735), also known as the "Horse Act of 1884", which was signed into law by President Chester A. Arthur on July 7, 1884. After the Civil War, many citizens faced difficulties in settling claims with the government for property confiscated for use in the war effort. As a result, Congress endowed enrolled agents with the power of advocacy to prepare claims against the government. From 1884 through the early 20th century, this statute remained largely unchanged.

When the Revenue Act of 1913 was passed, signed into law by President Woodrow Wilson on October 3, 1913, the scope of the enrolled agent was expanded to include claims for monetary relief for citizens whose taxes had become inequitable. As income, estate, gift and other sources of tax collections became more complex, the role of the enrolled agent increased to include the preparation of the many tax forms that were required. As a result of this complexity, audits became more prevalent and the enrolled agent role evolved into taxpayer representation, promulgating a series of statutes which were combined into a single Treasury Department Circular on February 19, 1921, known as Circular 230, to address "the laws and regulations governing the recognition of agents, attorneys, and other persons representing claimants before the Treasury Department and offices thereof."

== Becoming an enrolled agent ==
To become an enrolled agent, an applicant must obtain a Preparer Tax Identification Number (PTIN) from the IRS and must achieve passing scores on all three parts of the Special Enrollment Examination (SEE), or must have worked at the IRS for five consecutive years in a position regularly applying and interpreting the provisions of the Internal Revenue Code and the regulations relating to income, estate, gift, employment, or excise taxes. A background check, including a review of the applicant's personal and business tax compliance, is conducted after an applicant files Form 23, Application for Enrollment to Practice Before the Internal Revenue Service, within one year of completing all three parts of the examination.

== Maintaining enrolled agent status ==
=== Renewal for active enrolled agents ===
To qualify for renewal as an enrolled agent, an individual must complete 72 hours of continuing professional education (CPE) every three years, including two hours of ethics or professional conduct in each of the three years. To prevent overloading of CPEs in any year of an enrollment cycle, the IRS requires a minimum of 16 hours of CPE every year.

Individuals must annually renew their PTIN between October 16 and December 31 and must file Form 8554, Application for Renewal of Enrollment to Practice Before the Internal Revenue Service, within the applicable renewal period.

Renewal periods are based on the last digit of an enrolled agent's Social Security number (SSN) or tax identification number:

SSN ends in..	Renewal Period	Effective Date of Renewal	CPE Reporting Period
0, 1, 2, 3	11/01/21 – 01/31/22	04/01/22	01/01/19 – 12/31/21
4, 5, 6	11/01/19 – 01/31/20	04/01/20	01/01/17 – 12/31/19
7, 8, 9	11/01/20 – 01/31/21	04/01/21	01/01/18 – 12/31/20

=== Renewal after initial enrollment cycle ===
Individuals admitted to practice at any time during an enrollment cycle, "the three successive enrollment years preceding the effective date of renewal," must complete two hours of continuing professional education for each month of enrollment, including two hours of ethics or professional conduct in each year. If an individual receives initial enrollment between November 1 and April 1 of their applicable renewal period, they will not be required to renew until the expiration of the first full three-year enrollment cycle following their initial enrollment.

=== Failure to renew ===
An individual who has not filed a timely application for renewal, who has not made a timely response to the notice of noncompliance, or who has not satisfied the requirements of eligibility for renewal will be placed on a roster of inactive enrolled individuals. During this time, the individual will be ineligible to practice before the Internal Revenue Service and may not state or imply that they are eligible to represent taxpayers, use the term 'enrolled agent', or use the EA designation.

== Practice before the IRS: Enrolled agents and other practitioners ==
The right to practice before the Internal Revenue Service is regulated by Federal statute, and persons authorized to practice are known as "Federally Authorized Tax Practitioners", or "FATPs". The FATP status is granted to attorneys, certified public accountants, and enrolled agents, each having unlimited representation rights before the Internal Revenue Service. These practitioners may represent their clients on any matters including audits, collection actions, payment issues, tax refund matters, and appeals. FATP status is also granted with limited representation rights to enrolled actuaries, and enrolled retirement plan agents.

Enrolled agents, like other FATPs, are subject to a set of procedures and regulations described in Treasury Department Circular No. 230, Regulations Governing the Practice of Attorneys, Certified Public Accountants, Enrolled Agents, Enrolled Actuaries, and Appraisers before the Internal Revenue Service.

When practicing before the Internal Revenue Service, enrolled agents may not use the term "certified" in describing their professional designation. An enrolled agent admitted to practice before the Internal Revenue Service may not state or imply that an employer/employee relationship exists between the enrolled agent and the Internal Revenue Service.

== Practice in federal courts ==
Enrolled agent status does not authorize the enrollee to practice before the United States Tax Court or in any other court. Practice in U.S. Tax Court is limited to members of the bar of the court. The Internal Revenue Code states, "No qualified person shall be denied admission to practice before the Tax Court because of his failure to be a member of any profession or calling." Non-attorneys must pass a Tax Court exam for admission to the Bar of the Court. Attorneys are admitted to the Bar of the Tax Court without having to take the Tax Court examination. Practice in other federal courts is generally limited to persons licensed as attorneys.

== See also ==
- National Association of Enrolled Agents (NAEA)
- National Association of Tax Professionals (NATP)
- National Society of Accountants (NSA)
- Tax advisor
