= Preparer Tax Identification Number =

The Preparer Tax Identification Number (PTIN) is an identification number that all paid tax return preparers must use on U.S. federal tax returns or claims for refund submitted to the Internal Revenue Service (IRS). Anyone who, for compensation, prepares all or substantially all of any federal tax return or claim for refund must obtain a PTIN issued by the IRS.

== PTIN history ==
The Preparer Tax Identification Number was created on July 1, 1999 to protect the privacy of tax return preparers. Preparers were required to sign the tax forms they prepared and provide their Social Security Numbers. Starting with the 2000 tax season, the IRS gave preparers the option of using either their SSNs or PTINs. Between August 1999 and August 2010, the IRS issued more than 1 million PTINs.

== PTIN registration ==
On September 28, 2010, the IRS l launched a new, electronic PTIN sign-up system accessible through its website at www.irs.gov/taxpros. The new sign-up system requires return preparers to create an account, complete the PTIN application, pay a $64.25 fee l, and obtain a PTIN. However, immediately after a decision in 2017 in a U.S. Federal court case, this fee was no longer valid and there was no fee to obtain a PTIN while the case and those similar wound their way through the appeals process. By creating an account, preparers create a central location where they can receive IRS information. Preparers should receive their PTIN immediately. Preparers who already have a PTIN must renew their number if they received them prior to September 28, 2010. If all information matches, preparers may receive the same number. The PTIN must be renewed annually. As of October 22, 2020, the IRS now requires that those who wish to obtain or renew their PTIN pay a $35.95 fee. In October 2023, the PTIN fee was reduced to $19.75.

Each preparer must have his or her personal PTIN. Sharing a PTIN within an office or firm is not allowed. Preparers can submit a paper application, the Form W-12, but it will take four to six weeks to process. The electronic PTIN sign-up system takes 15 minutes to complete and process. Preparers can view an IRS YouTube video that explains the PTIN sign-up system.

Preparers who do not have social security numbers because of religious objections can complete the PTIN application and submit paper Form 8945, PTIN Supplemental Application For U.S. Citizens Without a Social Security Number Due To Conscientious Religious Objection. They must also include documentation on identity, U.S. citizenship and status in a recognized religious group.

== Foreign tax return preparers ==
Foreign tax return preparers who prepare U.S. tax returns must also obtain and use a PTIN. Foreign preparers who do not have or who are not eligible for social security numbers must complete the PTIN application and submit paper Form 8946, PTIN Supplemental Application For Foreign Persons Without a Social Security Number. Only preparers who have a foreign (non-U.S.) address may file this form.

== Outreach to tax return preparers ==
In October 2010, the IRS began sending notices to the 1 million PTIN holders it had on record, informing them of the rule changes and urging them to obtain a new or renewed PTIN before preparing tax returns in 2011. However, the agency does not know how many of those 1 million PTIN holders are still active tax return preparers, nor does the agency know how many total tax return preparers there are in the United States. In 2007, the IRS estimated that there were between 900,000 and 1.2 million paid preparers.

== Penalties ==
Return preparers who fail to obtain and use PTINs could face penalties. The IRS announced in November 2010 that it would not put the onus of compliance on individual taxpayers by rejecting tax returns without valid PTINs. However, the agency said it would contact those tax return preparers and urge them to comply with the PTIN mandate.

== RTRP program ==
The use of the PTIN predated by many years the launching of the IRS Registered Tax Return Preparer Program in 2010. Thus, the requirement that a tax return preparer use either a social security number or a PTIN when engaged in the business of preparing federal tax returns pre-dated the requirements that had been imposed by the Internal Revenue Service in its Registered Tax Return Preparer program.

== Loving v. Internal Revenue Service ==
On January 18, 2013, in a decision in Loving v. Internal Revenue Service, Judge James E. Boasberg of the U.S. District Court for the District of Columbia ruled that the Internal Revenue Service lacked the statutory authority to regulate tax return preparers. On February 1, 2013, the Court issued an additional order clarifying that the IRS is "not required to suspend its PTIN program," but that "no tax-return preparer may be required to pay testing or continuing-education fees or to complete any testing or continuing education."

In 2014, the U.S. Court of Appeals for the District of Columbia Circuit affirmed the judgment of the district court.
