= Certified Public Accountant =

Title of qualified accountants in many countries

Certified Public Accountant (CPA)
- Type: Qualified accountants
- Industry: Accounting and Finance

Certified Public Accountant (CPA) is the title of qualified accountants in many countries in the English-speaking world. It is generally equivalent to the title of chartered accountant in other English-speaking countries. In the United States, the CPA is a license to provide accounting services to the public. It is awarded by each of the 50 states for practice in that state. Additionally, all states except Hawaii have passed mobility laws to allow CPAs from other states to practice in their state. State licensing requirements vary, but the minimum standard requirements include passing the Uniform Certified Public Accountant Examination, 150 semester units of college education, and one year of accounting-related experience.

Continuing professional education (CPE) is also required to maintain licensure. Individuals who have been awarded the CPA but have lapsed in the fulfillment of the required CPE or who have requested conversion to inactive status are in many states permitted to use the designation "CPA Inactive" or an equivalent phrase. In most U.S. states, only CPAs are legally able to provide attestation (including auditing) opinions on financial statements. Many CPAs are members of the American Institute of Certified Public Accountants and their state CPA society.

State laws vary widely regarding whether a non-CPA is even allowed to use the title "accountant". For example, Texas prohibits the use of the designations "accountant" and "auditor" by a person not certified as a Texas CPA, unless that person is a CPA in another state, is a non-resident of Texas, and otherwise meets the requirements for practice in Texas by out-of-state CPA firms and practitioners.

As of Feb 2025, there are just over 678,000 active CPAs in the United States and this has been slow growing for the past few years, despite U.S. Bureau of Labor Statistic's prediction of higher than average demand for accountants in the future (2023-2033, 6% growth annually).

== History ==
In 1660, the first person who would conduct an audit was chosen in order to be able to manage the money that was raised by England in the Virginia Colony. With the help of chartered accountants from England and Scotland for training Americans to learn the procedures of accounting, many firms were established in America. The first American one was in 1895.

On July 28, 1882, the Institute of Accountants and Bookkeepers of the City of New York became the first accounting corporation which supports the need of people in the accounting field and for educational purposes. With the accountancy and industry growing in the world, the need of looking for services from professional accountants who had higher standards and were recognized had been considered. In 1887, the American Association of Public Accountants was created to set moral standards for the practice of accounting.

On April 17, 1896, Chapter 312 of the Laws of the State of New York established that the Regents of the University of the State of New York would provide a Certificate of Public Accountancy to individuals over age 21, of good moral character, and who possessed or intended to declare citizenship in the United States with appropriate accounting education or experience either through examination or previous experience. This was the first time the title "Certified Public Accountant" was regulated. Examinations were held in both Buffalo and New York City. Frank Broaker was licensee #1 and he received his certificate solely through previous experience as a public accountant and did not take an examination, commonly referred to as grandfathering. Broaker died on November 12, 1941. The first person to receive the CPA through examination and previous experience was Joseph Hardcastle, who would go on to become an accounting theorist and New York University professor. Hardcastle died on June 16, 1906, after being thrown from a horse after an accident with a wagon. The Chapter was introduced by New York Senator Albert Wray, New York Assemblyman Henry Marshall, and signed by New York Governor Morton as part of business reform. The Regents appointed a Board of Examiners, similar to today's NASBA, the first members of which were Charles Sprague, Frank Broaker, and C. W. Haskins

== CPA in various countries ==
In the United States, "CPA" is an initialism for Certified Public Accountant which is a designation given by a state governing agency, whereas other countries around the world have their own designations, which may be equivalent to "CPA".

In the United Kingdom, "CPA" is an initialism for Certified Public Accountant as well, but refers to an accounting and finance professional who is a member of the Certified Public Accountants Association (formerly the Association of Certified Public Accountants).

In Australia, the term "CPA" is an initialism for Certified Practicing Accountant. To become a CPA in Australia, it also requires a certain amount of education and experience to be eligible working in some specific areas in the accounting field.

In Canada, "CPA" is an initialism for Chartered Professional Accountant. This designation is for someone who would like to be a Canadian CPA. In order to be qualified for this certificate, candidates who major in accounting will get accepted to enter CPA Professional Education Program (CPA PEP). Provinces in Canada also allow non-accounting majors and international candidates to meet the requirements if they get into the CPA Prerequisite Education Program (CPA PREP).

In Hong Kong, "CPA" is also an initialism for Certified Public Accountant. Awarded by the Hong Kong Institute of Certified Public Accountants, accounting professionals have to meet specific educational and professional requirements, including passing a series of examinations through the Qualification Program ("QP") and gaining relevant work experience.

== Functions ==
One important function performed by CPAs relates to assurance services. The most commonly performed assurance services are financial audit services where CPAs attest to the reasonableness of disclosures, the freedom from material misstatement, and the adherence to the applicable generally accepted accounting principles (GAAP) in financial statements. CPAs can also be employed within corporations (termed "the private sector" or "industry") in finance or operations positions such as financial analyst, finance manager, controller, chief financial officer (CFO), or chief executive officer (CEO). These CPAs do not provide services directly to the public.

Although some CPA firms serve as business consultants, the consulting role has been under scrutiny following the Enron scandal where Arthur Andersen simultaneously provided audit and consulting services which affected its ability to maintain independence in its audit duties. This incident resulted in many accounting firms divesting their consulting divisions, but this trend has since reversed. In audit engagements, CPAs are (and have always been) required by professional standards and federal and state laws to maintain independence (both in fact and in appearance) from the entity for which they are conducting an attestation (audit and review) engagement. Although most individual CPAs who work as consultants do not also work as auditors, if the CPA firm is auditing the same company that the firm also does consulting work for, then there is a conflict of interest. This conflict voids the CPA firm's independence for multiple reasons, including: the CPA firm would be auditing its own work or the work the firm suggested, and, the CPA firm may be pressured into unduly giving a positive (unmodified) audit opinion so as not to jeopardize the consulting revenue the firm receives from the client.

CPAs also have a niche within the income tax return preparation industry. Many small to mid-sized firms have both a tax and an auditing department. Along with attorneys and Enrolled Agents, CPAs may represent taxpayers in matters before the Internal Revenue Service (IRS). Although the IRS regulates the practice of tax representation, it has no authority to regulate tax return preparers.

Some states also allow unlicensed accountants to work as public accountants. For example, California allows unlicensed accountants to work as public accountants if they work under the control and supervision of a CPA. However, the California Board of Accountancy itself has determined that the terms "accountant" and "accounting" are misleading to members of the public, many of whom believe that a person who uses these terms must be licensed. As part of the California Poll, survey research showed that 55 percent of Californians believe that a person who advertises as an "accountant" must be licensed, 26 percent did not believe a license was required, and 19 percent did not know.

Whether providing services directly to the public or employed by corporations or associations, CPAs can operate in virtually any area of finance including:

- Assurance and attestation services
- Corporate finance (merger and acquisition, initial public offerings, share and debt issuings)
- Corporate governance
- Estate planning
- Financial accounting
- Governmental accounting
- Financial analysis
- Financial planning
- Forensic accounting (preventing, detecting, and investigating financial frauds)
- Income tax
- Investment Banking
- Information technology, especially as applied to accounting and auditing
- Management consulting and performance management
- Tax preparation and planning
- Venture capital
- Private Equity
- Private Credit
- Financial reporting
- Regulatory compliance
- SOC engagements

== CPAs in the United States ==
=== CPA exam ===
To become a CPA in the United States, the candidate must sit for and pass the Uniform Certified Public Accountant Examination (Uniform CPA Exam), which is set by the American Institute of Certified Public Accountants (AICPA) and administered by the National Association of State Boards of Accountancy (NASBA). The Uniform CPA Exam consists of three core sections and three corresponding discipline sections. Candidates are required to take all three core sections and are permitted to choose one of the three discipline sections for a total of four sections.

CPA Exam Sections
Core Sections	Discipline Sections
Auditing and Attestation (AUD)	Information Systems and Controls (ISC)
Financial Accounting and Reporting (FAR)	Business Analysis and Reporting (BAR)
Taxation and Regulation (REG)	Tax Compliance and Planning (TCP)

The CPA designation was first established in law in New York State on April 17, 1896.

To qualify for the CPA examination in the United States, individuals typically need a bachelor's degree from an accredited institution with a minimum number of accounting and business-related credit hours (ranging from 120 to 150), and specific coursework in subjects such as auditing and financial accounting. Additional educational requirements, like a master's degree, may be necessary in some states. Residency and citizenship requirements, if applicable, vary by state. Candidates must apply through their state's Board of Accountancy, pay the requisite fees, and may need to pass an ethics exam. While work experience is not typically required for the exam itself, it is necessary for CPA licensure.

=== Other requirements ===
Although the CPA exam is uniform, licensing and certification requirements are imposed separately by each state's laws and therefore vary from state to state. Some states have a two-tier system whereby an individual would first become certified—usually by passing the Uniform CPA Exam. That individual would then later be eligible to be licensed once a certain amount of work experience is accomplished. Other states have a one-tier system whereby an individual would be certified and licensed at the same time when both the CPA exam is passed and the work experience requirement has been met. Two-tier states include Alabama, Florida, Illinois, Montana, and Nebraska. The trend is for two-tier states to gradually move towards a one-tier system. Since 2002, the state boards of accountancy in Washington and South Dakota have ceased issuing CPA "certificates" and instead issue CPA "licenses". Illinois planned to follow suit in 2012. A number of states are two-tiered, but require work experience for the CPA certificate, such as Ohio and Pennsylvania.

Like other professionals, CPAs are required to take continuing education courses toward continuing professional development (continuing professional education [CPE]) to renew their license. Requirements vary by state (Wisconsin does not require any CPE for CPAs) but the vast majority require an average of 40 hours of CPE every year with a minimum of 20 hours per calendar year. The requirement can be fulfilled through attending live seminars, webcast seminars, or through self-study (textbooks, videos, online courses, all of which require a test to receive credit). In general, state boards accept group live and group internet-based credits for all credit requirements, while some states cap the number of credits obtained through the self-study format. All CPAs are encouraged to periodically review their state requirements. As part of the CPE requirement, most states require their CPAs to take an ethics course at some frequency (such as every or every other renewal period). Ethics requirements vary by state and the courses range from 2–8 hours. AICPA guidelines (which are adopted by many state boards) grant licensees 1 hour of CPE credit for every 50 minutes of instruction.

=== Loss of licensure ===
A CPA license may be suspended or revoked for various reasons. Common reasons include these:

- Allowing the license to lapse without renewing in a timely manner.
- Performing attestation services under an unlicensed/unregistered CPA firm or under a CPA firm permit which has expired.
- Continuing to hold out as an active CPA on an expired license, which includes continued use of the CPA title on business cards, letterhead, office signage, correspondence, etc. after the license has expired.
- Using fraud or deceit in obtaining or renewing the CPA license, the most common occurrence being misrepresenting or falsifying compliance with or completion of the continuing education requirements as a condition for renewal.
- Being suspended or barred from practicing before another regulatory body such as the SEC or the IRS.
- "Discreditable acts", which can include
  1. failure to follow applicable standards (such as auditing standards when examining financial statements, or tax code when preparing tax returns); or
  2. violation of felony or serious misdemeanor criminal laws, which may or not be related to the practice of accountancy. (A notable example of a CPA whose license was revoked for non-financial related criminal activity is John Battaglia, convicted of the capital murders of his children).

=== Impact of technology ===
Many tasks that a CPA used to do while working have now been automated. Therefore, current and future CPAs are required to do more complex tasks with technology as the simpler tasks have become automated. An example of a more complex task would include analyzing and interpreting data using a visualization software. Technology is used regularly in the job to the point where technological proficiency is needed when starting as a CPA.

Since technological proficiency is more important than in prior years, accounting organizations have begun starting to teach technology within the accounting curricula in colleges and universities. One significant change was in 2013, when the Association to Advance Collegiate Schools of Business (AACSB) mandated that information technology be included in all accredited accounting programs. The transition to add information technology has not been one without challenges. One specific challenge with regards to adding information technology into accounting curricula is the balance of preparing students for the CPA exam and preparing to work as a CPA following graduation. Preparing for the CPA exam and preparing to work as a CPA after graduation can be different, making this difficult for professors and schools to figure out what to include in their curricula. Instructors generally agree that including data analytics should be included when teaching about accounting information systems as a whole but few instructors think that data analytics should be in the entire accounting curricula at schools.

=== Demographics of CPAs ===
A disparity exists among the demographics of AICPA members, specifically as it relates to class and gender. Between 1976 and 2005, 77% of CPAs were either middle or upper class and nearly half of all CPA candidates belonged to an upper middle class socioeconomic background. Although AICPA membership is predominated by individuals from wealthier socioeconomic backgrounds, 20% of AICPA members were lower class between 1976 and 2005. This indicates that the CPA profession is not exclusionary, but rather that it provides upward social and economic mobility. While women only accounted for 2.4% of all CPAs between 1934 and 1975, 50-60% of all hiring's by CPA firms were women between 2001 and 2010. Considering the unique barriers female CPAs may experience within the accounting profession, it is theorized that female CPAs come from higher socioeconomic backgrounds to overcome any gender bias they may experience. This would elucidate the higher prevalence of wealthy AICPA members who are women. These findings indicate that the demographic discrepancies among AICPA members have narrowed significantly in recent years.

=== Practice mobility: the substantial equivalency rule ===
An accountant is required to meet the legal requirements of any state in which the accountant wishes to practice. In recent years, practice mobility for CPAs has become a major business concern for CPAs and their clients. Practice mobility for CPAs is the general ability of a licensee in good standing from a substantially equivalent state to gain practice privilege outside of the practitioner's home state without getting an additional license in the state where the CPA will serve a client or an employer. In today's digital age, many organizations require the professional services of CPAs to conduct business on an interstate and international basis and have compliance responsibilities in multiple jurisdictions. As a result, the practice of CPAs often extends across state lines and international boundaries.

Differing requirements for CPA certification, reciprocity, temporary practice and other aspects of state accountancy legislation in the 55 U.S. licensing jurisdictions (the 50 states, Puerto Rico, the District of Columbia, the U.S. Virgin Islands, Guam and the Commonwealth of the Northern Mariana Islands) make the interstate practice and mobility of CPAs more complicated. By removing boundaries to practice in the US, CPAs are able to more readily serve individuals and businesses in need of their expertise. At the same time, the state board of accountancy's ability to discipline is enhanced by being based on a CPA and the CPA firm's performance of services (either physically, electronically or otherwise within a state), rather than being based on whether a state license is held.

The American Institute of Certified Public Accountants (AICPA) and the National Association of State Boards of Accountancy (NASBA) have analyzed the current system for gaining practice privileges across state lines and have endorsed a uniform mobility system. This model approach is detailed through the substantial equivalency provision (Section 23) of the Uniform Accountancy Act (UAA). The UAA is an "evergreen" model licensing law co-developed, maintained, reviewed and updated by the AICPA and NASBA. The model provides a uniform approach to regulation of the accounting profession.

Uniform adoption of the UAA's substantial equivalency provision creates a system similar to the nation's driver's license program by providing CPAs with mobility while retaining and strengthening state boards' ability to protect the public interest. The system enables consumers to receive timely services from the CPA best suited to the job, regardless of location, and without the hindrances of unnecessary filings, forms and increased costs that do not protect the public interest.

As of October 2012, a total of 49 out of the 50 states and the District of Columbia had passed mobility laws and were in the implementation and navigation phases. Only the Commonwealth of the Northern Mariana Islands, the Virgin Islands, Hawaii, Puerto Rico, and Guam have not passed mobility laws. A California mobility law went into effect July 1, 2013. The District of Columbia passed mobility laws effective on October 1, 2012.

=== AICPA membership ===
The CPA designation is granted by individual state boards, not the American Institute of Certified Public Accountants (AICPA). Membership in the AICPA is not obligatory for CPAs, although some CPAs do join. To become a full member of AICPA, the applicant must hold a valid CPA certificate or license from at least one of the fifty-five U.S. state/territory boards of accountancy; some additional requirements apply.

AICPA members approved a proposed bylaw amendment to make eligible for voting membership individuals who previously held a CPA certificate/license or have met all the requirements for CPA certification in accordance with the Uniform Accountancy Act (UAA). The AICPA announced its plan to accept applications from individuals meeting these criteria, beginning no later than January 1, 2011. Governance

Mark Koziel is the CEO of the Association of International Certified Professional Accountants (AICPA & CIMA) and the American Institute of CPAs. He started his role on January 1, 2025.

== See also ==
- The Institute of Chartered Accountants of India
- Hong Kong Institute of Certified Public Accountants
- CPA Magazine
- Institute of Certified Public Accountants in Ireland (CPA Ireland)
- Certified Management Accountant by the Institute of Management Accountants
- Certified National Accountant (Nigeria)
- Institute of Public Accountants
- Certified Practising Accountant (Australia)
- Chartered Certified Accountant (ACCA)
- Chartered Global Management Accountant
- Legal liability of Certified Public Accountants
