= List of Brock University people =

The following is a list of notable alumni, faculty and affiliates that are associated with Brock University in St.Catharines, Ontario, Canada.

== Notable Brock alumni ==
=== Academic leaders ===
- Lorraine Janzen Kooistra (BA) — professor of English at Toronto Metropolitan University and an elected fellow of the Royal Society of Canada
- Samir Trabelsi — CPA Ontario Distinguished Scholar and Professor of Governance and Accounting at Goodman School of Business
- Mariana Valverde (BA) — Professor of Criminology at the University of Toronto and former Director of the University of Toronto's Centre for Criminology & Sociolegal Studies
- Lee Ward — Alpha Sigma Nu Distinguished Professor of Political Studies at the University of Regina

=== Actors, film, and media ===
- Kenneth Bi — Filmmaker
- Rick Campanelli (BPhEd, 1994) — former host of MuchMusic and reporter for ET Canada
- Jared Pelletier — film director
- Matthew Santoro (MA, 2010) — YouTube personality

=== Athletics and sports ===
- Ray Barkwill (BSc Phys.Geog 2010) — Canadian national rugby team
- Stan Butler (Masters Ed. 1988) —Ontario Hockey League coach, North Bay Battalion
- Kyle Dubas (BSM 2009) — General Manager of the Pittsburgh Penguins
- Dennis Hull — retired National Hockey League player
- Dan MacKenzie (B.Ed. 1995) — Canadian sports and marketing executive
- Sean Pierson — Canadian National Team wrestler; professional mixed martial artist, welterweight in the UFC
- Tonya Verbeek (BRLS, 2000; BEd, 2003; Med, 2006) — 2004 Olympics silver medalist (wrestling), 2008 Olympics bronze medalist (wrestling)
- Shawn Williams — six-time National Lacrosse League All-Star

=== Business leaders and entrepreneurs ===
- Denis Dyack (BPhEd, 1990; BSc 1990) — President of Silicon Knights Inc.
- Vince Molinaro (BA, 1985) — leadership consultant, public speaker, and New York Times bestselling author
- Colin Freeman (BA, 2007) - Senior Director, Brand and Digital Marketing, Canadian Olympic Committee
- Colin Dano (BA, 2016) - Fixed Income Trader at BMO Capital Markets

=== Literature and the arts ===
- Daniel Adair — musician, Nickelback
- J.M. Frey (BA, 2005) — award-winning science fiction and fantasy writer
- Marc Jordan — musician
- Peter McLaren — author
- Yuri Rubinsky (BA, 1972) — writer and publisher
- Kari-Lynn Winters (BA, 1992) — children's author, professor of education

=== Political leaders ===
- Malcolm Allen — Member of the House of Commons of Canada
- Rick Dykstra (BA, 1997) — Member of the House of Commons of Canada
- Brian McMullan — Mayor of St. Catharines
- Sean O'Sullivan — former Progressive Conservative Member of Parliament and Roman Catholic priest
- Kyle Rae — City of Toronto's first gay councillor
- Karen Kraft Sloan (BAdmin, 1982) — former Member of the House of Commons of Canada
- Jenna Sudds — MP for Kanata (2021-present)

== Notable Brock faculty members and affiliates ==
- Beatrice Ombuki-Berman - Computer Scientist, Chair of Computer Science Department
- Charles Burton — Distinguished Sinologist, policy advisor and diplomat
- Kim Campbell (LL.D, 1998) — first female Prime Minister of Canada
- Buzz Hargrove (LL.D, 1998) — President, Canadian Auto Workers trade union
- Paul House (LL.D, 2008) — President, CEO, TDL Corp. (Tim Hortons)
- Liette Vasseur — biologist, President of the Canadian Commission for UNESCO

== Presidents ==
1. Dr. James Alexander Gibson (1965–1973)
2. Dr. Alan Earp (1973–1988)
3. Dr. Terrence White (1988–1997)
4. Dr. David W. Atkinson (1997–2005)
5. Dr. Jack N. Lightstone (2007–2016)
6. Dr. Gervan Fearon (2017–2021)
7. Dr. Lesley Rigg (2022–present)

== Chancellors ==
1. Richard L. Hearn (1967–1969)
2. Charles Sankey (1969–1974)
3. Cecil Shaver (1974–1980)
4. Ralph Misener (1980–1985)
5. Robert S. K. Welch (1985–2000)
6. Raymond Moriyama (2001–2007)
7. Ned Goodman (2007–2015)
8. Shirley Cheechoo (2015–2020)
9. Hilary Pearson (2020–Present)
