= Paul House =

Paul House may refer to:

- Paul D. House (1943–2021), Canadian businessman and executive chairman of TDL Group Corporation
- Paul R. House (born 1958), American Old Testament scholar and former president of the Evangelical Theological Society
