= List of fossil beech species =

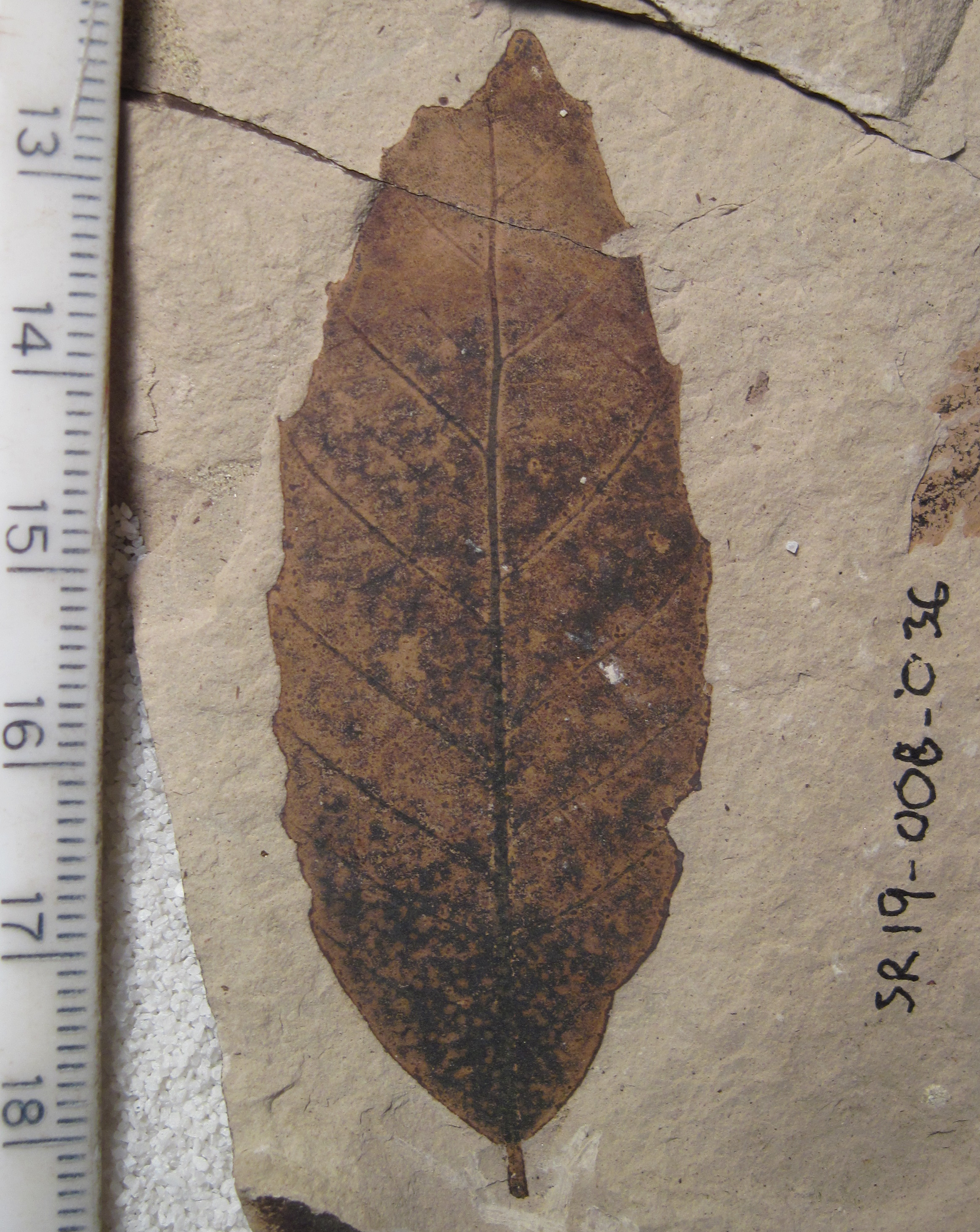
Fagus langevinii, Ypresian, Eocene Okanagan Highlands, North America

Numerous species of beech, in the genus Fagus, have been named globally from the fossil record spanning from the Cretaceous to the Pleistocene.

== Species ==
- †Fagus aburatoensis Tanai, 1951
- †Fagus alnitifolia Hollick
- †Fagus altaensis Kornilova & Rajushkina, 1979
- †Fagus ambigua (Massalongo) Massalongo, 1853
- †Fagus angusta Andreánszky, 1959
- †Fagus antipofii Heer, 1858
- †Fagus aperta Andreánszky, 1959
- †Fagus arduinorum Massalongo, 1858
- †Fagus aspera (Berry) Brown, 1944
- †Fagus aspera Chelebaeva, 2005 (jr homonym)
- †Fagus atlantica Unger, 1847
- †Fagus attenuata Göppert, 1855
- †Fagus aurelianii Marion & Laurent, 1895
- †Fagus australis Oliver, 1936
- †Fagus betulifolia Massalongo, 1858
- †Fagus bonnevillensis Chaney, 1920
- †Fagus castaneifolia Unger, 1847
- †Fagus celastrifolia Ettingshausen, 1887
- †Fagus ceretana (Rérolle) Saporta, 1892
- †Fagus chamaephegos Unger, 1861
- †Fagus chankaica Alexeenko, 1977
- †Fagus chiericii Massalongo, 1858
- †Fagus chinensis Li, 1978
- †Fagus coalita Rylova, 1996
- †Fagus cordifolia Heer, 1883
- †Fagus cretacea Newberry, 1868
- †Fagus decurrens Reid & Reid, 1915
- †Fagus dentata Göppert, 1855
- †Fagus deucalionis Unger, 1847
- †Fagus dubia Mirb, 1822
- †Fagus dubia Watelet, 1866 (jr homonym)
- †Fagus echinata Chelebaeva, 2005
- †Fagus eocenica Watelet, 1866
- †Fagus etheridgei Ettingshausen, 1891
- †Fagus ettingshausenii Velenovský, 1881
- †Fagus europaea Schwarewa, 1960
- †Fagus evenensis Chelebaeva, 1980
- †Fagus faujasii Unger, 1850
- †Fagus feroniae Unger, 1845
- †Fagus florinii Huzioka & Takahashi, 1973
- †Fagus forumlivii Massalongo, 1853
- †Fagus friedrichii Grímsson & Denk, 2005
- †Fagus gortanii Fiori, 1940
- †Fagus grandifoliiformis Panova, 1966
- †Fagus gussonii Massalongo, 1858
- †Fagus haidingeri Kováts, 1856
- †Fagus herthae (Unger) Iljinskaja, 1964
- †Fagus hitchcockii Lesquereux, 1861
- †Fagus hondoensis (Watari) Watari, 1952
- †Fagus hookeri Ettingshausen, 1887
- †Fagus horrida Ludwig, 1858
- †Fagus humata Menge & Göppert, 1886
- †Fagus idahoensis Chaney & Axelrod, 1959
- †Fagus inaequalis Göppert, 1855
- †Fagus incerta (Massalongo) Massalongo, 1858
- †Fagus integrifolia Dusén, 1899
- †Fagus intermedia Nathorst, 1888
- †Fagus irvajamensis Chelebaeva, 1980
- †Fagus japoniciformis Ananova, 1974
- †Fagus japonicoides Miki, 1963
- †Fagus jobanensis Suzuki, 1961
- †Fagus jonesii Johnston, 1892
- †Fagus juliae Jakubovskaya, 1975
- †Fagus kitamiensis Tanai, 1995
- †Fagus koraica Huzioka, 1951
- †Fagus kraeuselii Kvaček & Walther, 1991
- †Fagus kuprianoviae Rylova, 1996
- †Fagus lancifolia Heer, 1868 (nomen nudum)
- †Fagus langevinii Manchester & Dillhoff, 2004
- †Fagus laptoneura Ettingshausen, 1895
- †Fagus latissima Andreánszky, 1959
- †Fagus leptoneuron Ettingshausen, 1893
- †Fagus macrophylla Unger, 1854
- †Fagus maorica Oliver, 1936
- †Fagus marsillii Massalongo, 1858
- †Fagus menzelii Kvaček & Walther, 1991
- †Fagus microcarpa Miki, 1933
- †Fagus miocenica Ananova, 1974
- †Fagus napanensis Iljinskaja, 1982
- †Fagus nelsonica Ettingshausen, 1887
- †Fagus oblonga Suzuki, 1959
- †Fagus oblonga Andreánszky, 1959
- †Fagus obscura Dusén, 1908
- †Fagus olejnikovii Pavlyutkin, 2015
- †Fagus orbiculatum Lesquereux, 1892
- †Fagus orientaliformis Kul'kova
- †Fagus orientalis var fossilis Kryshtofovich & Baikovskaja, 1951
- †Fagus orientalis var palibinii Iljinskaja, 1982
- †Fagus pacifica Chaney, 1927
- †Fagus palaeococcus Unger, 1847
- †Fagus palaeocrenata Okutsu, 1955
- †Fagus palaeograndifolia Pavlyutkin, 2002
- †Fagus palaeojaponica Tanai & Onoe, 1961
- †Fagus pittmanii Deane, 1902
- †Fagus pliocaenica Geyler & Kinkelin, 1887 (jr homonym)
- †Fagus pliocenica Saporta, 1882
- †Fagus polycladus Lesquereux, 1868
- †Fagus praelucida Li, 1982
- †Fagus praeninnisiana Ettingshausen, 1893
- †Fagus praeulmifolia Ettingshausen, 1893
- †Fagus prisca Ettingshausen, 1867
- †Fagus pristina Saporta, 1867
- †Fagus producta Ettingshausen, 1887
- †Fagus protojaponica Suzuki, 1959
- †Fagus protolongipetiolata Huzioka, 1951
- †Fagus protonucifera Dawson, 1884
- †Fagus pseudoferruginea Lesquereux, 1878
- †Fagus pygmaea Unger, 1861
- †Fagus pyrrhae Unger, 1854
- †Fagus salnikovii Fotjanova, 1988
- †Fagus sanctieugeniensis Hollick, 1927
- †Fagus saxonica Kvaček & Walther, 1991
- †Fagus schofieldii Mindell, Stockey, & Beard, 2009
- †Fagus septembris Chelebaeva, 1991
- †Fagus shagiana Ettingshausen, 1891
- †Fagus stuxbergii Tanai, 1976
- †Fagus subferruginea Wilf et al., 2005
- †Fagus succinea Göppert & Menge, 1853
- †Fagus sylvatica var diluviana Saporta, 1892
- †Fagus sylvatica var pliocenica Saporta, 1873
- †Fagus tenella Panova, 1966
- †Fagus uemurae Tanai, 1995
- †Fagus uotanii Huzioka, 1951
- †Fagus vivianii Unger, 1850
- †Fagus washoensis LaMotte, 1936

== Species formerly in the genus ==
Fagopsis undulata from the Early Eocene of Wyoming

Fossil species formerly placed in the genus Fagus include:

- †Alnus paucinervis (Borsuk) Iljinskaja
- †Castanea abnormalis (Fotjanova) Iljinskaja
- †Fagopsis longifolia (Lesquereux) Hollick
- †Fagopsis undulata (Knowlton) Wolfe & Wehr
- †Fagoxylon grandiporosum (Beyer) Süss
- †Fagus-pollenites parvifossilis (Traverse) Potonié
- †Juglans ginannii Massalongo (formerly Fagus ginannii)
- †Nothofagaphyllites novae-zealandiae (Oliver) Campbell
- †Nothofagus benthamii (Ettingshausen) Paterson
- †Nothofagus dicksonii (Dusén) Tanai
- †Nothofagus lendenfeldii (Ettingshausen) Oliver
- †Nothofagus luehmannii (Deane) Paterson
- †Nothofagus magelhaenica (Ettingshausen) Dusén
- †Nothofagus maidenii (Deane) Chapman
- †Nothofagus muelleri (Ettingshausen) Paterson
- †Nothofagus ninnisiana (Unger) Oliver
- †Nothofagus risdoniana (Ettingshausen) Paterson
- †Nothofagus ulmifolia (Ettingshausen) Oliver
- †Nothofagus wilkinsonii (Ettingshausen) Paterson
- †Trigonobalanus minima (M. Chandler) Mai
