= Fachhochschule für Technik und Wirtschaft =

Fachhochschule für Technik und Wirtschaft or FHTW is the name for universities of applied sciences (Fachhochschulen) with focus on technology and business in Germany.

There are several FHTWs in Germany:

- Fachhochschule für Technik und Wirtschaft Berlin
- Reutlingen University, (officially called Fachhochschule für Technik und Wirtschaft Reutlingen until 2002)
- Fachhochschule für Technik und Wirtschaft Vechta/Diepholz in Oldenburg
