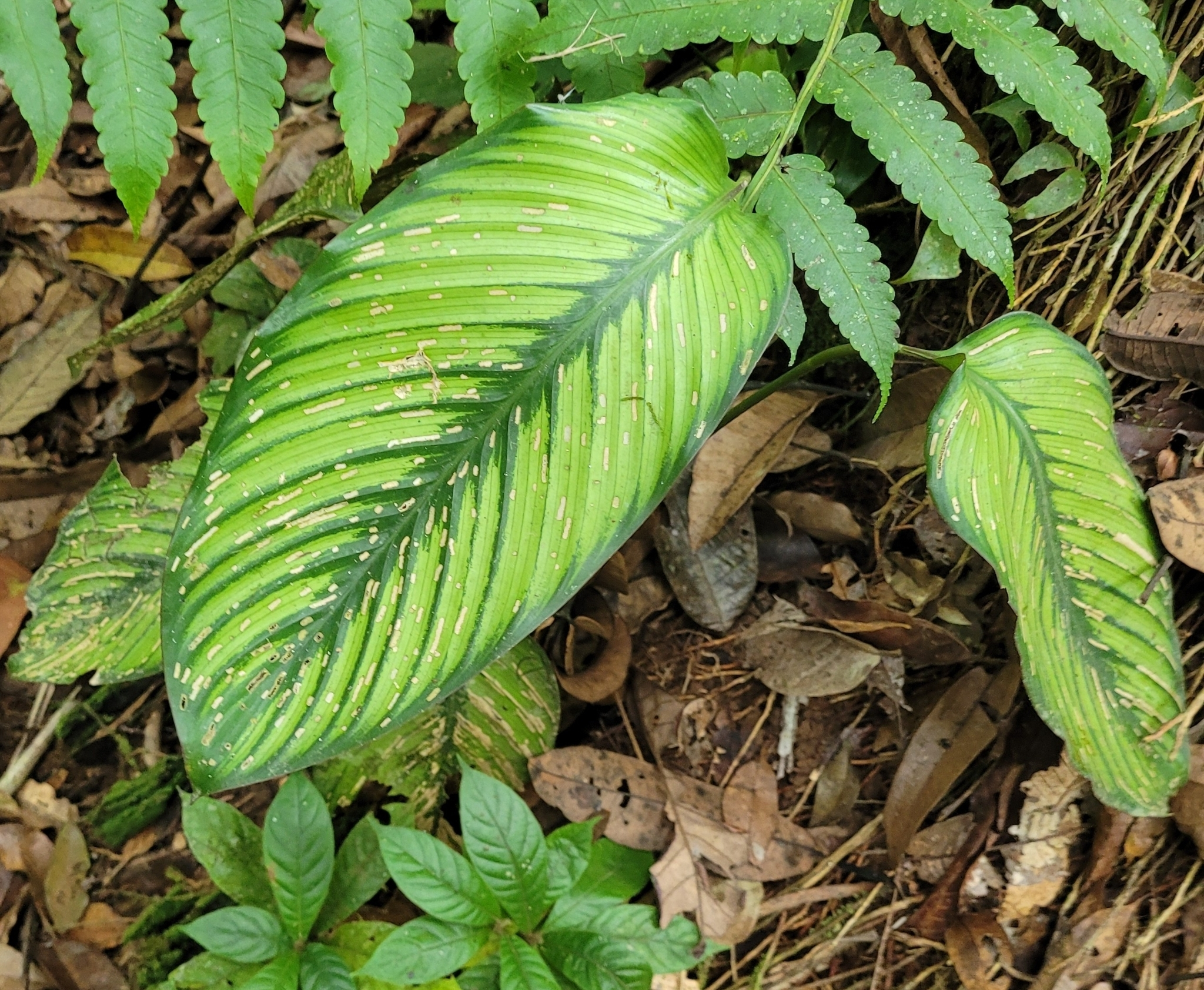
- Goeppertia incompta with the brush pattern

Scientific classification
- Kingdom: Plantae
- Clade: Tracheophytes
- Clade: Angiosperms
- Clade: Monocots
- Clade: Commelinids
- Order: Zingiberales
- Family: Marantaceae
- Genus: Goeppertia
- Species: G. incompta

Binomial name
- Goeppertia incompta (H.Kenn.) Borchs. & S.Suárez

Synonyms
- Calathea incompta H.Kenn.

= Goeppertia incompta =

Species of plant

Goeppertia incompta is a species of plant from the genus Goeppertia, in the family Marantaceae. It is native to Costa Rica, more precisely from the Puntarenas Province. It was discovered by Helen Kennedy in 1997, described as Calathea incompta in Canadian Journal of Botany. This species belongs to the sub-group of Goeppertia called the Ornata clade.

== Description ==
Goeppertia incompta is a big sized plant with large, long and ovale green leaves with thick, green petioles and a long, green pulvinus. This species often develops a pattern called a "brush pattern" which consists of two, broad yellowish green bands on each sides of the leaf, which makes it belong in the Ornata group of Goeppertia. Those bands are, on this species, overlapped by dark green veins. The pattern often disappear when the plant matures and the leaves become entirely green but some specimens can retain it. The inflorescence is made of multiple, pointy bracts around a long, green peduncle and are in a shape of a little spike. The bracts are usually green but can become brownish on some variegated plants, the flowers are white with a yellow center.
