= Kooistra =

Kooistra is a Dutch-language surname. Notable people with the surname include:

- Clarence L. Kooistra (born 1941), American politician
- Joost Kooistra (born 1976), Dutch volleyball player
- Lorraine Janzen Kooistra, Canadian academic
- Paul Kooistra (born 1942), American minister and college president
- Pieter Kooistra (1922–1988), Dutch artist and advocate for a global basic income
- Sam Kooistra (1935–2010), American water polo player, brother of William
- Scott Kooistra (born 1980), American football player
- William Kooistra (1926–1995), American water polo player, brother of Sam
- Wytze Kooistra (born 1982), Dutch volleyball player
