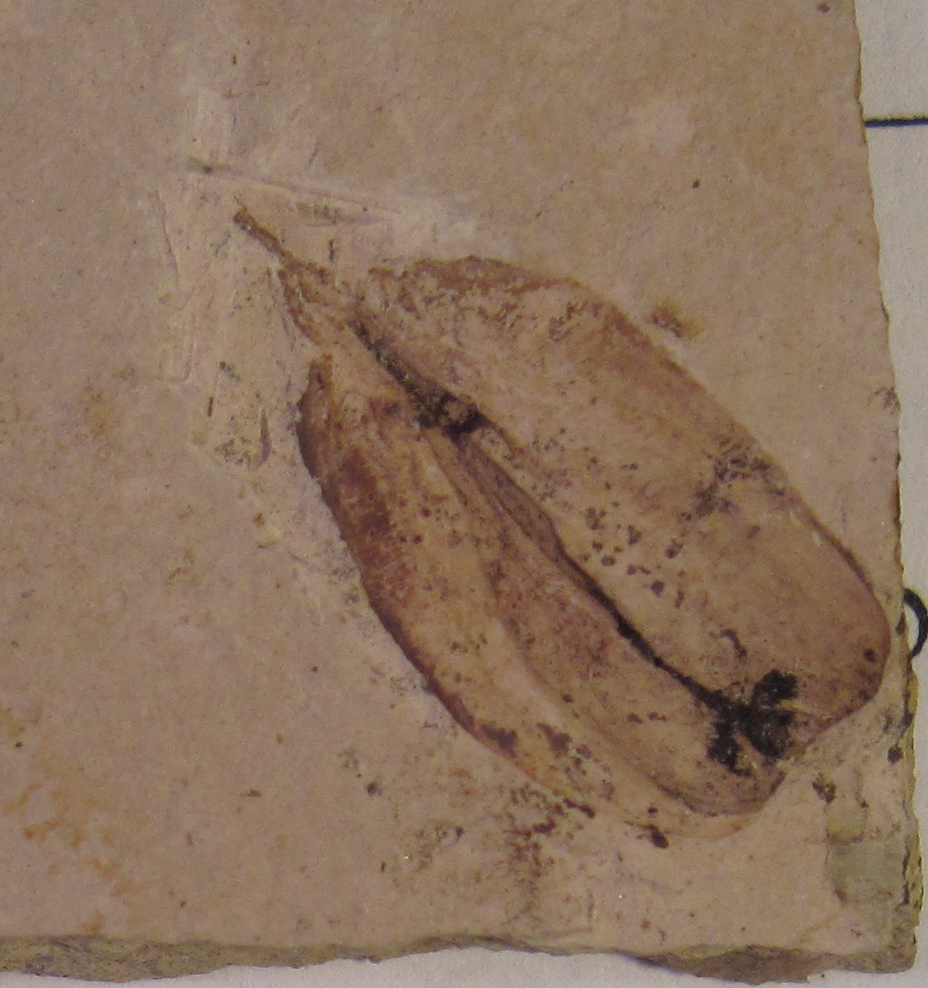
- Fagus langevinii nutlet

Scientific classification
- Kingdom: Plantae
- Clade: Tracheophytes
- Clade: Angiosperms
- Clade: Eudicots
- Clade: Rosids
- Order: Fagales
- Family: Fagaceae
- Genus: Fagus
- Species: F. langevinii

Binomial name
- Fagus langevinii Manchester & Dillhoff

= Fagus langevinii =

Fagus langevinii Temporal range: Ypresian

Fossil species of beech tree

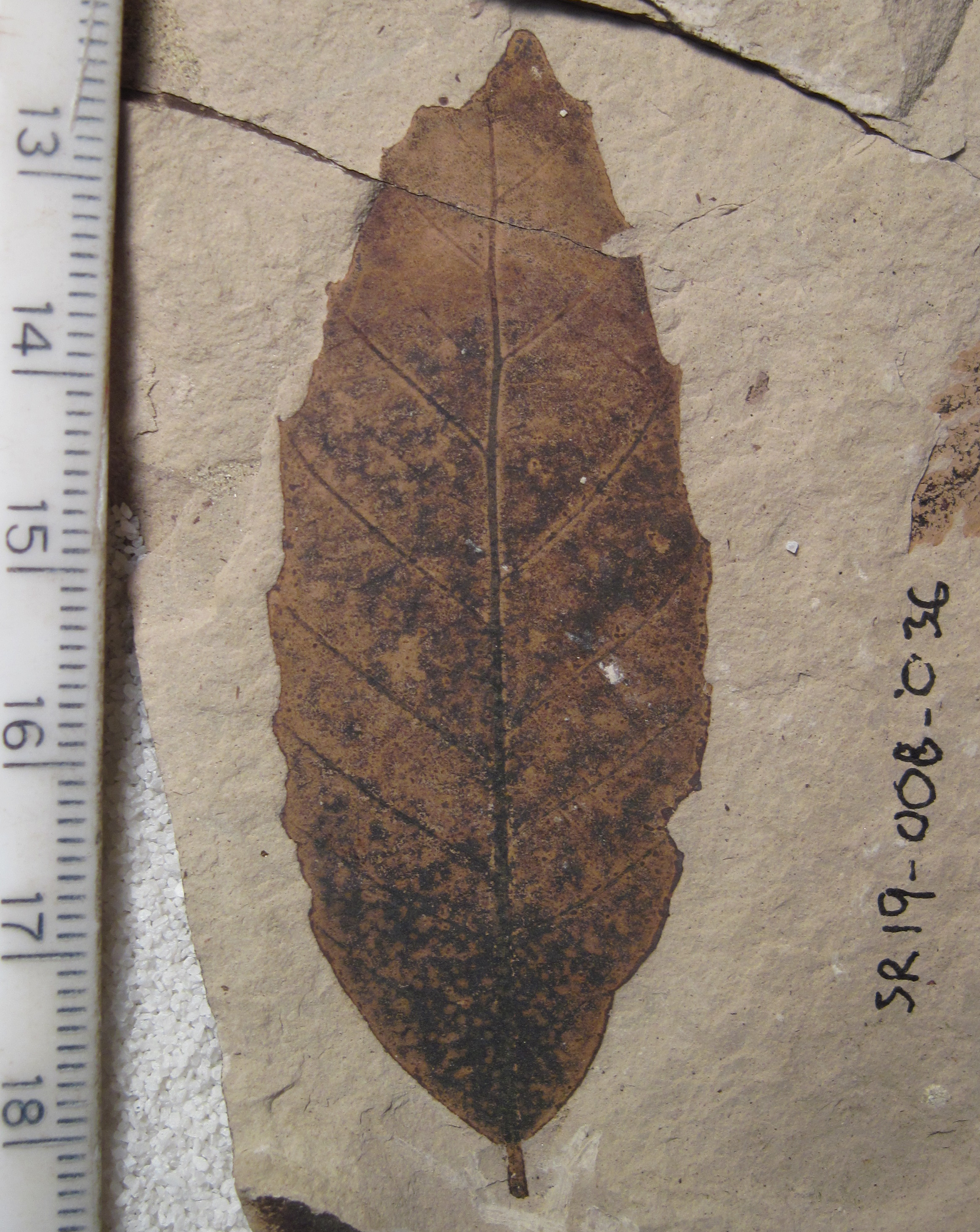
F. langevinii leaf

Fagus langevinii is an extinct species of beech in the family Fagaceae. The species is known from fossil fruits, nuts, pollen, and leaves found in the early Eocene deposits of South central British Columbia, and northern Washington state, United States.

== Distribution ==
The described specimens are from the Eocene Okanagan Highlands British Columbian sites of McAbee and Falkland in the Tranquille Formation, the Allenby Formation around Princeton, and with additional fossils also known from the Klondike Mountain Formation in north eastern Washington. Tuffs of the Klondike Mountain Formation had been dated to 49.42 ± 0.54 million years ago, the youngest of the Okanagan Highlands sites, though a revised oldest age of 51.2 ± 0.1 million years ago was given based on isotopic data published in 2021. The lake sediments at McAbee were first radiometrically dated using the K-Ar method in the 1960s based on ash samples exposed in the lake bed. These samples yielded an age of ~51 million years ago; however, a data published in 2005 provided a ^{40}Ar-^{39}Ar radiometric date placing the McAbee site at 52.9 ± 0.83 million years ago. Dillhoff, Leopold, and Manchester (2005) identified leaves belonging to Fagus, but not placed to species, from the Eocene Okanagan highland sites of the Chu Chua Formation, British Columbia.

== History and classification ==
Fossil leaves identified as Fagus species were first briefly mentioned by Gandolfo (1999) from Republic and the Allenby Formation in Princeton, while fossil nuts and cupules from Republic and McAbee were first mentioned briefly by Pigg and Wehr (2002). The fossil material was studied subsequently by Steven R. Manchester and Richard Dillhoff (2004) with the type description of the species being published in the Canadian Journal of Botany. They designated the holotype as cupule specimen UWBM 97583, which was in the paleobotanical collections of the Burke Museum in Seattle at that time. The cupule, from the McAbee site, was supplemented by a suit of paratype fossils encompassing additional cupules, nuts, leaves and a branchlet with attached leaves and axillary buds. The paratypes were specimens of the Burke museum, as well as the University College of the Cariboo in Kamloops, British Columbia and the Florida Museum of Natural History in Gainesville, Florida. Not included in the type series were pollen samples washed from a matrix specimen collected at McAbee. Manchester and Dillhoff coined the specific epithet langevinii as a patronym honoring David Langevin for his dedication to the collection and study of McAbee fossils.

F. langevinii cupules have a similar morphology to that seen in species of Fagus subgenus Engleriana, having antler like appendages present, and also having pollen morphology resembling those species. The leaves however are more similar to species of the paraphyletic Fagus subgenus Fagus. F. langevinii is considered the earliest unequivocal Fagus species described, and used as support for a northwestern North American origin of the genus.

== Description ==
Fagus langevinii cupules range between 10–14 mm (0.39–0.55 in) long by 8–13 mm (0.31–0.51 in) wide giving an ovate outline. Each cupule is born on an up to 29 mm (1.1 in) long peduncle which thickens near its apical end. The peduncles can reach up to 2.5 times the cupule length. Across the outer surface of the cupules spiny ornamentations up to 1.2 mm (0.047 in) high and occasionally forking once near the tips. Each cupule has four valves which contain the two trigonal nuts. The 7.0–10.5 mm (0.28–0.41 in) long by 4.5–7.5 mm (0.18–0.30 in) wide nuts range from obovate through elliptical to ovate in outline, and occasionally sport a small flange or wing along each angle of the nut.

The leaves sprout from branchlets that end with enlarged and rounded axillary buds unaccompanied by stipules. The leaf petioles are thin, being between 0.8–1.0 mm (0.031–0.039 in) thick, and ranging from 7–13 mm (0.28–0.51 in) long and meet the leaf blade at an asymmetrical to symmetrical base. The 5.2–19.3 cm (2.0–7.6 in) long by 2.7–7.4 cm (1.1–2.9 in) wide leaves are elliptical to ovate in outline, with an acute to rarely obtuse base and an acute apex. The upper and lower margins are typically convex in outline with simple teeth spaced at regular intervals along the edges where the secondary veins terminate. The teeth are non-glandular with a straight to convex basal side and a concave to straight apical side leading into a rounded sinus. Each leaf is pinnately veined with 9-17 secondaries that run up to and terminate at the margins from a thickened primary vein. The pairs of parallel secondaries fork from the primary at angles of 40–60° with the fork angle decreasing from base to apex. There are no inter-secondary veins, agrophic veins or fimbrial veins present. The percurrent tertiary veins fork from the secondaries in an opposite to occasionally alternate pattern and run in straight to sinuous pattern across the intersecondary space. The quaternary veins range between percurrent and forming a polygonal reticulate mesh from which the quintary veins arise. Together the fourth and fifth order veins form an orthogonal reticulum wit well developed polygonal areolar spaces that have 4-5 sides and singly forked freely ending veinlets.

The isolated but associated pollen grains are 16–20 μm (0.00063–0.00079 in) in polar width and have a 16–20 μm (0.00063–0.00079 in) equatorial diameter. They are round in polar view and tricolporate, having three groves in a triangular pattern. Each of the three colpi are narrow and run almost all the way to the polar apices from the equator. The surfaces are covered with woven vermiform microornamentation terminating in rod-like elements.

== Paleoecology ==
Fagus langevinii was likely found growing at distance from the highland lakes, based on the worn and abraded nature of preserved cupules with missing spines along the outer surfaces. The Okanagan Highland sites represent upland lake systems that were surrounded by a warm temperate ecosystem with nearby volcanism. The highlands likely had a mesic upper microthermal to lower mesothermal climate, in which winter temperatures rarely dropped low enough for snow, and which were seasonably equitable. The Okanagan Highlands paleoforest surrounding the lakes have been described as precursors to the modern temperate broadleaf and mixed forests of Eastern North America and Eastern Asia. Based on the fossil biotas the lakes were higher and cooler then the coeval coastal forests preserved in the Puget Group and Chuckanut Formation of Western Washington, which are described as lowland tropical forest ecosystems. Estimates of the paleoelevation range between 0.7–1.2 km (0.43–0.75 mi) higher than the coastal forests. This is consistent with the paleoelevation estimates for the lake systems, which range between 1.1–2.9 km (1,100–2,900 m), which is similar to the modern elevation 0.8 km (0.50 mi), but higher.

Estimates of the mean annual temperature have been derived from climate leaf analysis multivariate program (CLAMP) analysis and leaf margin analysis (LMA) of both the Princeton and Republic paleofloras. The CLAMP results after multiple linear regressions for Republic gave a mean annual temperature of approximately 8.0 °C (46.4 °F), while the LMA gave 9.2 ± 2.0 °C (48.6 ± 3.6 °F). Princeton's multiple linear regression CLAMP results gave a slightly lower 5.1 °C (41.2 °F), and the LMA returned a mean annual temperature of 5.1 ± 2.2 °C (41.2 ± 4.0 °F). This is lower than the mean annual temperature estimates given for the coastal Puget Group, which is estimated to have been between 15–18.6 °C (59.0–65.5 °F). The bioclimatic analysis for Republic and Princeton suggest mean annual precipitation amounts of 115 ± 39 cm (45 ± 15 in) and 114 ± 42 cm (45 ± 17 in) respectively.
