= Samir Trabelsi =

Tunisian-born professor of economics (born 1968)

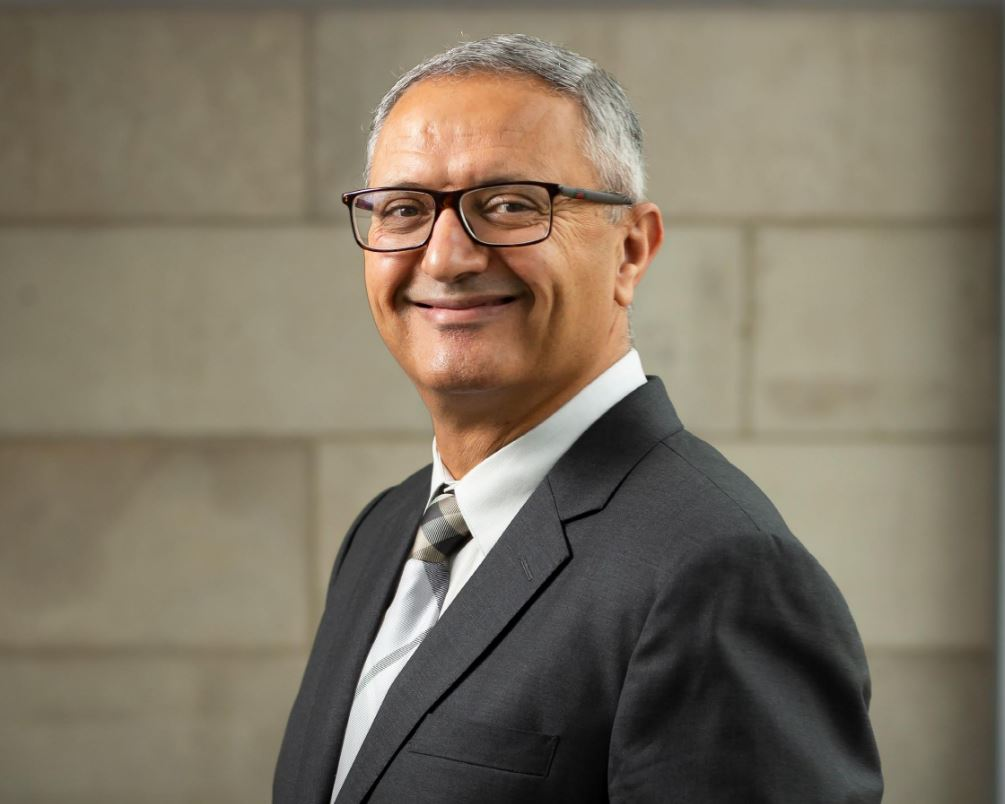
- Trabelsi in 2022
- Born: 1968 (age 57–58)
- Title: Professor

Academic background
- Education: HEC Montreal

Samir Trabelsi (Arabic: سمير الطرابلسي; born 1968) is an academic researcher, economist and professor of accounting and governance at the Goodman School of Business of Brock University. Trabelsi began teaching at Goodman School of Business in 2004. In 2021, he was awarded the title of Distinguished Scholar by CPA Ontario. Prior to his academic career, Trabelsi practiced public accounting at KPMG Tunisia.

In July 2022, Trabelsi was elected as the President of the Canadian Academic Accounting Association for a three-year mandate.

Trabelsi is a frequent speaker and commentator on issues in the areas of corporate governance, sustainability, fighting corruption, and risk management for various news media such including TV, radio, and print media.
