= Botany (journal) =

- Discipline: Botany
- Language: English, French
- Edited by: Liette Vasseur; Shelley Hepworth

Publication details
- Former name: Canadian Journal of Botany
- History: 1935–present
- Publisher: Canadian Science Publishing (Canada)
- Frequency: Continuous
- Impact factor: 1.4 (2025)

Standard abbreviations
- ISO 4: Botany

Indexing
- ISSN: 1916-2804

Links
- Journal homepage

Botany is a peer-reviewed scientific journal published by Canadian Science Publishing. It publishes research in plant science and related fields, with a scope that includes both fundamental and applied research on plants and other photosynthetic organisms. The journal publishes original research as well as review articles, methods, and commentary.

== Scope ==
The journal covers a broad range of plant science, including ecology, evolution, genetics and genomics, systematics, physiology, biochemistry, structure and development, mycology, phycology, and phytogeography. The journal also welcomes interdisciplinary research and work incorporating Traditional and Indigenous Knowledge.

== History ==
Botany traces its history to the Canadian Journal of Research, established in 1929. In 1935, the journal was divided into sections, including Canadian Journal of Research, Section C: Botanical Sciences. In 1951, the botanical section became Canadian Journal of Botany. The journal was published under that title until 2007 and adopted the title Botany beginning with volume 86 in 2008.

== Editorial leadership ==
The journal's editors-in-chief are Liette Vasseur of Brock University and Shelley Hepworth of Carleton University. The editorial board includes associate editors and an Early Career Researcher editorial board.

== Affiliations ==
Botany has partnerships with the Canadian Botanical Association, the Canadian Society of Plant Biologists, and the Canadian Society for Ecology and Evolution.
