= Mariana Valverde =

Canadian criminologist

Mariana Valverde FRSC

Academic background
- Education: Brock University (BA); York University (MA, PhD)
- Thesis: French Romantic socialism and the critique of political economy

Academic work
- Discipline: Criminologist, sociologist
- Sub-discipline: Sociology of law
- Institutions: Trent University; York University; University of Toronto
- Website: http://www.individual.utoronto.ca/marianavalverde/

Mariana Valverde FRSC is a Canadian criminologist and sociologist. She is currently a professor in the Centre for Criminology and Sociolegal Studies at the University of Toronto. Her research mainly focuses on the sociology of law. She is also an occasional contributor to Spacing magazine.

In 2000 Mariana Valverde won the Herbert Jacob book prize from the Law and Society Association for her book Diseases of the Will: Alcohol and the Dilemmas of Freedom (Cambridge University Press, 1998).

== Selected works ==
- Valverde, Mariana. (1991). The Age of Light, Soap, and Water: Moral Reform in English Canada 1880s-1920s. Toronto: University of Toronto Press.
- Valverde, Mariana. (1998). Diseases of the Will: Alcohol and the Dilemmas of Freedom. Cambridge: Cambridge University Press.
- Valverde, Mariana. (2003). Law’s Dream of a Common Knowledge. Princeton University Press.
- Valverde, Mariana. (2006). Law and Order: Signs, Meanings, Myths. Routledge.
- Valverde, Mariana. (2012). Everyday law on the Street: City Governance in an Age of Diversity. Chicago University Press.
