= ESB Business School =

Public university in Reutlingen, Germany

Coordinates: 48°29′27″N 9°12′21″E

- Motto: Truly International
- Type: Public University / Business School
- Established: 1971
- President: Prof. Dr. Hendrik Brumme
- Dean: Prof. Dr. Markus Conrads
- Faculty: ca. 60
- Administrative staff: ca. 60
- Students: ca. 2,500
- Location: Reutlingen, Baden-Württemberg, Germany
- Campus: Reutlingen University
- Colors: Blue and White
- Mascot: ESBear
- Website: www.esb-business-school.de

The ESB Business School (formerly ESB Reutlingen) is Reutlingen University's business school founded in 1971 and based in Baden-Württemberg, Germany. Since 2008, the school is responsible for all business and production management related degree programs of the university. The school offers 17 undergraduate and graduate programs as well as double degree programs in cooperation with numerous other business schools from around the world. The ESB Business School ranks among the top business schools in Germany and belongs to the five percent of all business schools worldwide who have earned the AACSB accreditation.

== Undergraduate programs ==
=== Single degree programs ===
- Bachelor of Science (Wirtschaftsingenieurwesen - Sustainable Production and Business) in 3 1/2 years
- Bachelor of Science (Internationales Wirtschaftsingenieurwesen - Operations) in 3 1/2 years

=== Double degree programs ===
==== Bachelor of Science in International Management Double Degree ====
Bachelor of Science in International Management and a second bachelor's degree of a partner university within the International Partnership of Business Schools in 4 years.

==== Bachelor of Science in International Business ====
The International Business (IB) program, offers students the possibility of acquiring within only four years the degrees Bachelor of Science (BSc) and Master of Business Administration (MBA) or another master's degree (MSc/MA). Students complete three and a half academic years at Reutlingen University, including a practical internship and a study abroad semester.

== Graduate programs ==
=== MSc ===
==== Master of Science in International Accounting, Controlling and Taxation ====
This Master of Science program prepares students for a management career in accounting, finance and controlling with an international focus. Usually, all semesters of the program are spent at the ESB Reutlingen.

==== Master of Science in International Business Development ====
This program focuses on the transfer of practice-oriented, detailed knowledge to the development of new business ideas.

==== Master of Science in Global Management and Digital Competencies ====
The ESB also offers a one-year Master of Science in Global Management and Digital Competencies. One semester of the program is spent at the ESB in Reutlingen, the other semester at one of four international partner schools from the International Partnership of Business Schools (IPBS) network.

==== Master of Science in Operations Management ====
ESB currently offers a two-year MSc program: Master of Science in Operations Management, with its main focus on the interface of business and technology.

==== Master of Science in Digital Industrial Management and Engineering ====
The MSc Digital Industrial Management and Engineering is the ESB's research master's program.

=== MA ===
==== Master of Arts in European Management Studies ====
A trilingual (German, French, English) Master of Arts in European Management Studies is offered. In this two-year program students spend one year in Reutlingen and one year in Strasbourg at the Ecole de Management de Strasbourg and receive two master's degrees.

=== MBA ===
The ESB offers a full-time and part-time MBA program focused on International Management.

The MBA program can be completed full-time in two semesters (full-time program) or five semesters (part-time program).

== History ==
In 1971, the faculty of Foreign Economics was founded at Reutlingen University from which the faculties School of International Business (SIB) and Production Management (initially: the Manufacturing Department) derived. The Manufacturing Department commenced in 1973. The European School of Business (ESB) was founded as an independent faculty by Prof. Dr. Hans Tümmers with the goal of internationalising and renewing the German Management qualification. The first partner universities were the Reims Management School in Reims (France), as well as the Middlesex University in London (United Kingdom.)

On 1 June 2008, the business faculties School of International Business (SIB), Production Management and the European School of Business of Reutlingen University were united as the new ESB Business School.
