= Beatrice Ombuki-Berman =

Kenyan-Canadian computer scientist

- Born: Beatrice Moraa Ombuki
- Citizenship: Kenya; Canada
- Education: Jomo Kenyatta University of Agriculture and Technology; University of the Ryukyus
- Occupations: Computer scientist, professor
- Known for: Research in evolutionary computation and particle swarm optimization
- Scientific career
- Fields: Artificial intelligence, evolutionary computation
- Workplaces: Brock University

Beatrice Moraa "Betty" Ombuki-Berman is a computer scientist whose research focuses on evolutionary computation and particle swarm optimization. Originally from Kenya, and educated in Kenya and Japan, she has settled in Canada as a professor at Brock University and chair of the Brock University Computer Science Department.

== Early life and education ==
Ombuki-Berman is originally from western Kenya, where her father was a mathematics teacher. After a degree in double mathematics and computer science from Jomo Kenyatta University of Agriculture and Technology (JKUAT), and working in industry, she became an instructor at JKUAT. After studying the Japanese language through classes at JKUAT, and applying a second time after her first application was denied, she obtained a scholarship funding her studies in Japan.

Her initial studies there involved intensive language training at the Osaka University of Foreign Studies. She continued her studies at the University of the Ryukyus, studying information engineering, where she received a master's degree in 1998 and completed her Ph.D. in 2001.

== Career and later life ==
Although originally intending to return to Kenya, Ombuki-Berman successfully applied for a faculty position at Brock University, seeking additional professional experience; she chose Brock because a relative was also studying in Ontario at Western University. She has remained there since.

As well as chairing Brock's Computer Science Department, Ombuki-Berman was the founding chair of the newly formed Yousef Haj-Ahmad Department of Engineering in 2021, continuing as interim chair until a new chair, Shahryar Rahnamayan, was hired in 2022.

On top of her career position, Ombuki-Berman is also a member of the Black Community Forum at Brock, or BCfab.

== Recognition ==
Ombuki-Berman was a keynote speaker at BE-STEMM 2024, the national conference of the Canadian Black Scientists Network.

== Personal life ==
Four years after moving to Canada, Ombuki-Berman married Michael Berman, a philosopher at Brock University. They have two daughters.
