= Newcastle Business School =

Business school in England

Coordinates: 54°58′32.24″N 1°36′15.82″W

- Type: Public
- Accreditation: AACSB AACSB Accounting EPAS Small Business Charter
- Students: 7,000 (on campus) and additional students studying online and by correspondence
- Location: Newcastle Business School, City Campus East, Northumbria University, Newcastle upon Tyne, NE1 8ST, Tyne and Wear, UK
- Campus: Urban
- Website: www.northumbria.ac.uk/about-us/academic-departments/newcastle-business-school

Newcastle Business School is a business school in the north of England, based in Newcastle-upon-Tyne, England. It is part of the Faculty of Business and Law at Northumbria University.

The business school offers undergraduate education in Business, Management, leadership, and the MBA qualification.

Having been awarded Association to Advance Collegiate Schools of Business (AACSB International) accreditation in business and accounting, the school is part of an elite group of 1% of business schools worldwide. The School is also accredited by the European Foundation for Management Development (EPAS) for 18 undergraduate programmes – more than any business school in the UK.

In November 2015, Newcastle Business School won the "Business School of the Year award" at the highly prestigious THE Awards. The judges reflected that it was the result of a strategic review which has seen the Business School establish research-rich and industry-relevant course content alongside partnerships with employers to create a strong curriculum focus on ethics and employability and place an emphasis on personal development and reflective professional practice. They went on to recognise that, as a result, Newcastle Business School has seen a 41% increase in internship opportunities and now has the largest suite of programmes in the UK accredited by the EPAS scheme, run by international management education body the EFMD.

In May 2014, the Business School joined an international elite by becoming one of only 10 global institutions outside the US and the only one in Europe to be accredited in both business and accounting by the International Association to Advance Collegiate Schools of Business (AACSB).

Newcastle Business School is ranked in the Top 10 for Graduate Level Employability in The Sunday Times Good University Guide 2011 and 2012. The school outperforms the sector average on postgraduate teaching, research, and international students. It is accredited by all of the key Professional Bodies and has 18 undergraduate programmes accredited by the European Foundation for Management Development (EPAS).
