= Paul D. House =

Canadian businessman (died 2021)

Paul Douglas House (1943 or 1944 – October 25, 2021) was a Canadian businessman who served as the Executive Chairman of TDL Group Corporation (Tim Hortons). He was born in Stoney Creek, Ontario in 1943. His career included a position as a director at Wendy's International, as well as President (1995–) and Chief Executive Officer (2005–2021) of Tim Hortons Inc. He was previously Chief Operating Officer of Tim Hortons from 1992 to 2005 before taking his final position. He received a BA in Economics from McMaster University in 1969. He was a member of the Deans Advisory Council for the Goodman School of Business.

House died on October 25, 2021, at the age of 78.
