= Reutlingen University =

University in Reutlingen, Germany

Coordinates: 48.4826°N 9.18715°E

- Hochschule Reutlingen
- Type: Public
- Established: 1855
- Budget: € 55,3 M
- Chancellor: Alexander Leisner
- President: Hendrik Brumme
- Academic staff: 158 (as of 2017)
- Administrative staff: 442 (as of 2017)
- Students: 5,500 (as of 2019)
- Location: Reutlingen, Baden-Württemberg, Germany
- Website: www.reutlingen-university.de

Reutlingen University (in German Hochschule Reutlingen; formerly FHTW Reutlingen) is a university of applied sciences, involved in education and research. It is located in Reutlingen in the southern German state of Baden-Württemberg. Enrollment stands at about 5,500 students, a quarter of whom are international and exchange students. Reutlingen University has a long tradition as a second home for international students; over a quarter of the students currently registered come from countries outside Germany. The university offers undergraduate and graduate programs in the main fields of International Business, Engineering, Information, Medical and Natural Science and Design. In contrast to common university structures, the orientation of the faculties is less the result of the sciences located there. It rather results from their industry driven specialization. The five schools of Reutlingen University are the School of Applied Chemistry, ESB Business School, the School of Information Technology, the School of Engineering and the School of Textiles & Design. Top Five placements in various rankings and its reputation amongst industry and commerce has made it one of Germany's most prestigious universities of applied sciences.

Reutlingen University's campus sits on the southwestern edge of Reutlingen, close to recreation and sport areas (including the city football stadium). Two bus lines serve the campus, and the town center is a 20-minute walk away. Two neighborhood centers are each a five-minute walk from campus and the dormitories, featuring shopping centers, banks, and doctors.

== History ==
=== Foundation in the Kingdom of Württemberg ===
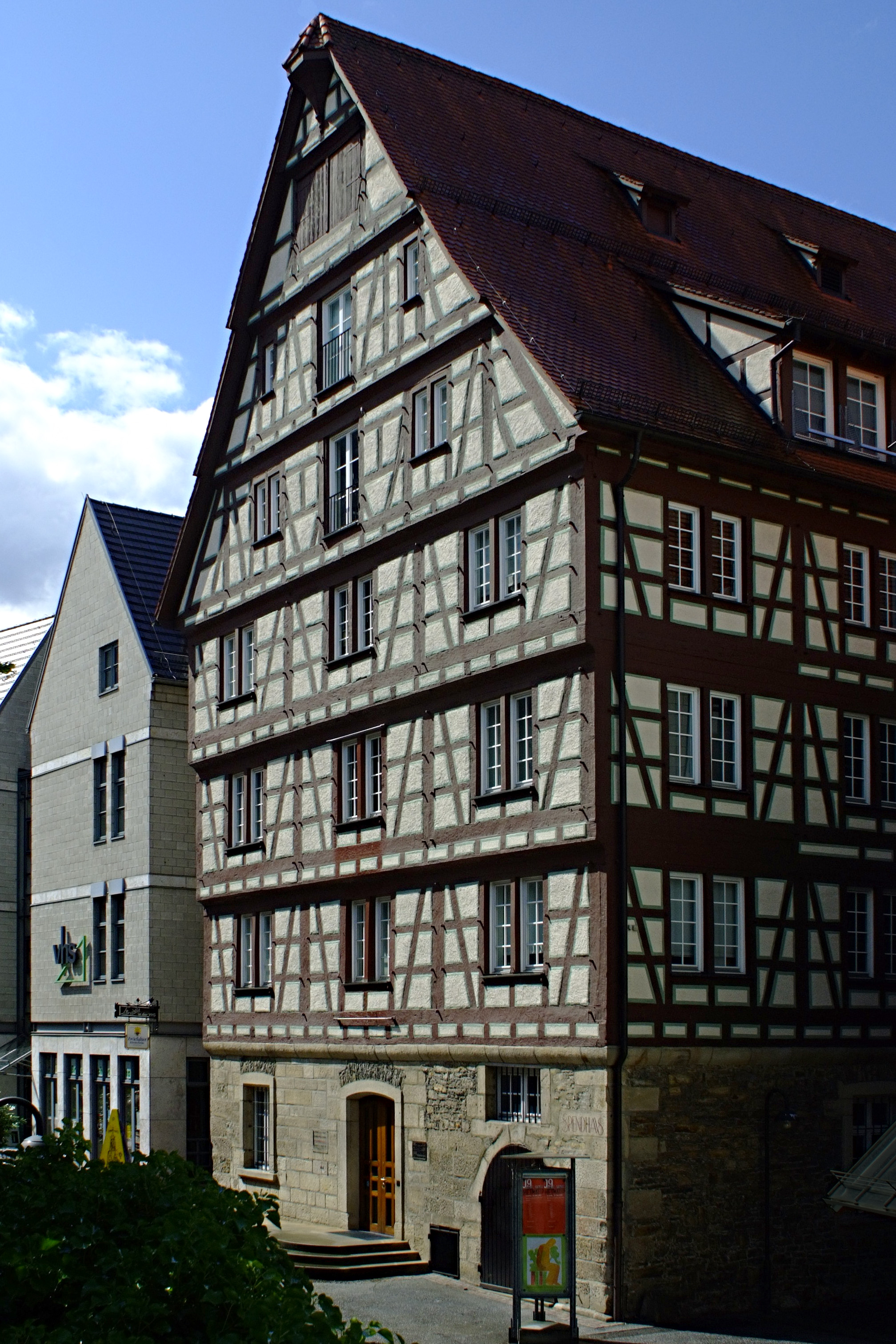
The so-called "Spendhaus" was the first residence to the weaving school.

The history of Reutlingen University goes back to the School of Weaving established in 1855 by the Kingdom of Württemberg, the city of Reutlingen, and the textile industry. The school was renamed in 1891 and became the Royal College of Technology for Textile Industry (German: Königlich Württembergisches Technikum für Textilindustrie), a technical college for spinning, weaving, and knitting. After the end of monarchy in 1918, the college received state recognition and changed its name once more to the State College of Technology (German: Staatliches Technikum). Two years later, the State Testing and Examination Authority for Textiles was founded in Reutlingen.

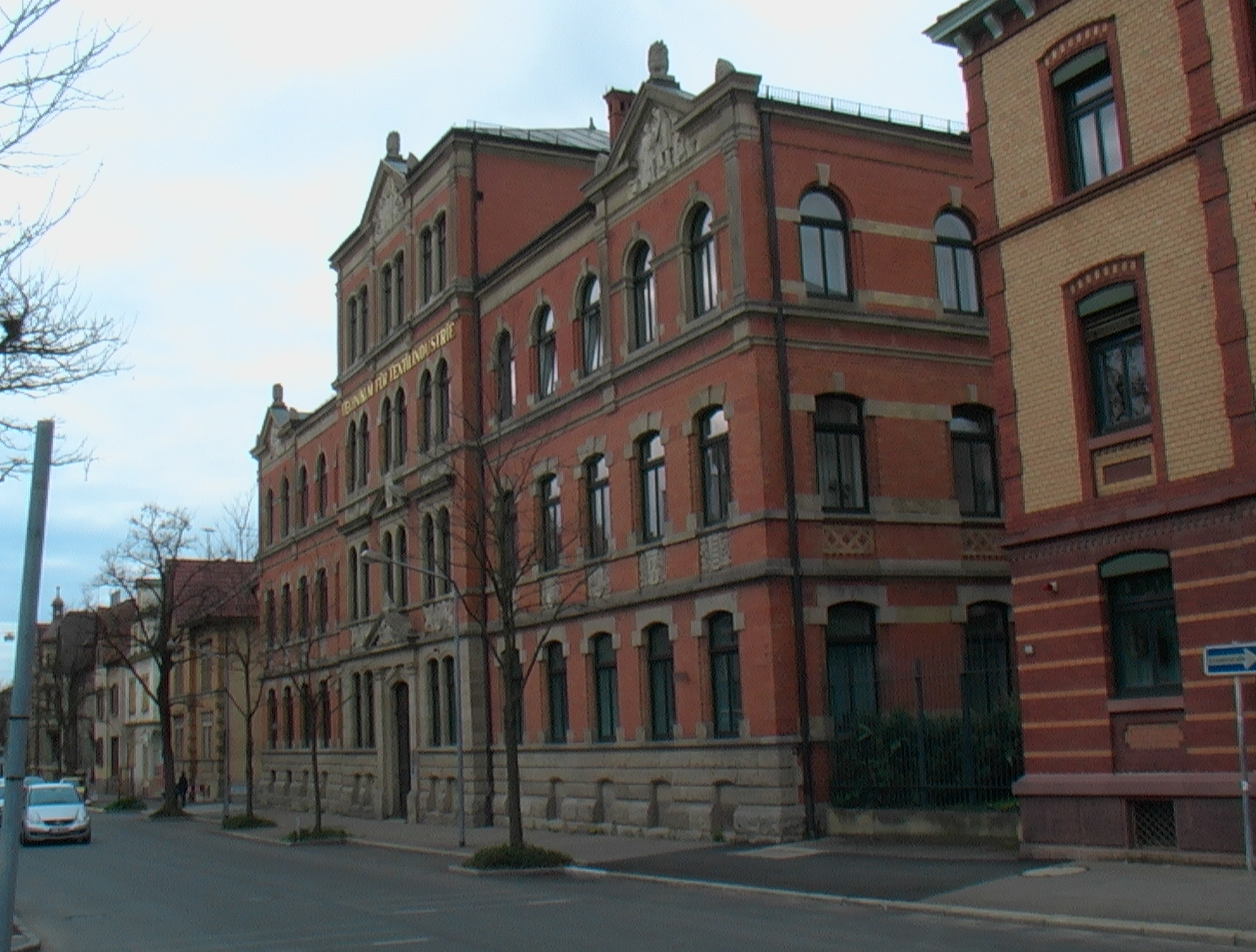
The brick building at Kaiserstr. 99 in Reutlingen was built in 1891 and housed the College of Technology until 1994. Today, it is home to the police headquarters of Reutlingen.

=== Extension after World War II ===
In 1967, Mechanical Engineering was added to the State College of Technology, and in 1971, the College received official recognition as a Fachhochschule (University of Applied Sciences). In the Department of Business Studies, the first course in International Business began. A year later, the business course Production Management enrolled its first students.

Work began on the new Hohbuch campus in 1975, and the university moved there in 1977. The old buildings in the center of town were handed over to the police force, and parts of the original equipment from the Weaving School and other documentation were placed in the Industrial Museum of Reutlingen.

=== Internationalization and Addition of Further Schools ===
In 1979, the European Study Program for Business Management (ESB), with its partner schools Middlesex University in London and NEOMA Business School Reims, enrolled its first students. With this new program, Reutlingen University became the first partner institution for double degrees in Germany. With its internationalization strategy, Reutlingen University increased its global reputation. In mid-2008, Reutlingen University merged all three of its business schools (European School of Business, School of International Business, and Production Management) into one school under the European School of Business (ESB) name. Today, ESB Business School ranks among the top business schools in Germany.

Today's Building 2, home to the School of Applied Chemistry, opened in 1983, and in 1984, the first students entered Automation Technology and Business Information Science classes. The same year, the Export Academy Baden-Württemberg was founded at the university with a postgraduate degree course in International Marketing.

The largest building on campus opened in 1987 by the Minister-President of Baden-Württemberg with space for Reutlingen University's technology departments. The degree course in Electronic Engineering began in 1989. The degree courses, Mechatronics and Media/Communication Information Technology, opened their doors in 2003. In full accordance with European agreements, all degree courses switched in 2003 to internationally recognized Bachelor's and Master's qualifications.

=== Establishment of International Reputation ===
Today, Reutlingen University comprises five schools with international accreditation: School of Applied Chemistry (AC, Angewandte Chemie), ESB Business School (ESB), School of Information Technology (INF, Informatik), School of Engineering (TEC, Technik) and School of Textiles & Design (TD, Textil & Design). It has over 200 partner universities worldwide and offers 16 Bachelor's degrees and 23 Master's degrees, including MBA's for officers of the Bundeswehr (Federal Defense of Germany).

== Organization ==
Since 2012, Hendrik Brumme is President of Reutlingen University, succeeding his predecessor Peter Nieß und Wolfgang Hiller. Since 2019, Alexander Leisner is chancellor and hence head of administration. The University's President is elected by the University Advisory Board, which is responsible for the development and competitiveness of the University. Moreover, it supervises the management of the President’s Office and deals with further matters concerning its own management, such as the election of the President or decisions about its structure and development plan. The Chairman of the University Advisory Board is Christoph Kübel, Managing Director and Director of Industrial Relations of Robert Bosch GmbH. The schools are organized decentrally and directed by Faculty Deans, who are elected by their respective school council. Students have an institutionalized right to participate in the decision making process through Senator mandates, seats in the school councils or as appointed members of academic commissions. Furthermore, a so-called AStA and the constituted student body engage in improving the students' study conditions and supporting student initiatives.

== Schools & Degree Programs ==
=== School of Applied Chemistry ===
About 500 students study at the School of Applied Chemistry (AC). Research and teaching are focusing the fields of medical technology, environmental protection, food, automotive, plastics and electronics.

Study Programs at the School of Applied Chemistry at Reutlingen University
Graduation Degree	Academic Degree	Study Program
Bachelor	Bachelor of Science	Applied Chemistry
Bachelor	Bachelor of Science	Biomedical Sciences
Master	Master of Science	Biomedical Sciences
Master	Master of Science	Polymer & Process Analytical Chemistry
Master	Master of Engineering	Environmentalism

=== ESB Business School ===
With about 2500 students (of which about 30 percent come from abroad), ESB Business School (ESB) is the largest of the five schools. The main fields for research and teaching are business administration, foreign trade, business engineering and business development. Since 2019 ESB Business School has been accredited by the AACSB for one of the highest international quality standards. Thereby, ESB Business School belongs to the world's best five percent of all business schools. Since 2013 it has been accredited by FIBAA, the programme "International Management Double Degree" with premium seal.

Study programs at ESB Business School
Graduation Degree	Academic Degree	Study Program
Bachelor	Bachelor of Science	International Business
Bachelor	Bachelor of Science	International Management (Double Degree)
Bachelor	Bachelor of Science	Internationales Wirtschaftsingenieurwesen - Operations (Business Engineering)
Bachelor	Bachelor of Science	Wirtschaftsingenieurwesen - Sustainable Production & Business (Business Engineering)
Master	Master of Arts	European Management Studies
Master	Master of Science	International Accounting, Controlling and Taxation
Master	Master of Science	International Business Development
Master	Master of Science	Global Management and Digital Competencies
Master	Master of Science	Operations Management (Business Engineering)
Master	Master of Science	Digital Industrial Management and Engineering (Double Degree)
Master	Master of Arts	International Retail Management
Master	Master of Science	Consulting & Business Analytics
Master	Master of Arts	Consulting & Sales Management
Master	Master of Business Administration	International Management Part-Time
Master	Master of Business Administration	International Management Full-Time

=== School of Information Technology ===
With 860 students, the School of Information Technology (INF) is the third largest faculty at the university. The study programs concentrate on scientific areas related to digitisation and digitalization.

Study Programs at the School of Information Technology at Reutlingen University
Graduation Degree	Academic Degree	Study Program
Bachelor	Bachelor of Science	Media and Communication Informatics
Bachelor	Bachelor of Science	Medical-technical Informatics
Bachelor	Bachelor of Science	Business Informatics
Master	Master of Science	Digital Business Engineering
Master	Master of Science	Human-Centered Computing
Master	Master of Science	Services Computing
Master	Master of Science	Business Informatics

=== School of Engineering ===
At Reutlingen University, around 1140 students study at the School of Engineering (TEC). The faculty's research activities are supported by the Robert Bosch Centre for Power Electronics (rbz), a research and teaching cooperation between Robert Bosch GmbH, Reutlingen University and the University of Stuttgart.

Study Programs at the School of Engineering at Reutlingen University
Graduation Degree	Academic Degree	Study Program
Bachelor	Bachelor of Engineering	International Project Engineering
Bachelor	Bachelor of Engineering	Mechanical Engineering
Bachelor	Bachelor of Engineering	Mechatronics
Bachelor	Bachelor of Science	Digital Engineering and Management
Master	Master of Science	Decentralized Energy Systems and Energy Efficiency
Master	Master of Science	Power and Micro Electronics
Master	Master of Science	Mechanical Engineering
Master	Master of Science	Mechatronics

=== School of Textiles & Design ===
The School of Textiles & Design represents the oldest department (since 1855) and the historical origin of Reutlingen University. About 690 of the over 5.000 students at Reutlingen University are enrolled here. Thematically, researching and teaching concentrates on textile technology, fashion, retail and design. The faculty includes affiliates such as the research laboratory F+TRC (Fashion and Textile Research Center) and an extensive machinery park with laboratories. The faculty owns the world's most extensive collection of historically significant fabrics (approx. 900 objects).

Study Programs at the School of Textiles and Design at Reutlingen University
Graduation Degree	Academic Degree	Study Program
Bachelor	Bachelor of Science	International Fashion Retail
Bachelor	Bachelor of Arts	Textile Design / Fashion Design
Bachelor	Bachelor of Engineering	Textile Technologie and Textile Management
Bachelor	Bachelor of Arts	Transportation Interior Design
Master	Master of Science	Interdisciplinary Product Development
Master	Master of Science	Textile Chain Research
Master	Master of Arts	Design

== Center for Applied Research ==
Applied research and development are carried out in several institutes on campus. Research and development projects supported by state and federal ministries, and also by the European Union, are carried out in cooperation with industry - in particular with small- and medium-size enterprises. By this means the institutes make contributions to the innovative ability of German industry and provide topical relevance to students. Research is focused mainly in the following areas:

Institute for Applied Research (IAF)

- Process analysis, control, and optimization
- Clothing technology, quality management, technical textiles
- Renewable resources, polymer materials
- Interface analysis and surface technology

Institute for Applied Research in Automation (IFA)

- Production Automation and Sensor Systems (PASS) focusing mainly on image processing, robotics, telematics, signal processing, and driverless transportation systems
- CAD/CAM in Design and Simulation, innovation management, benchmarking and energy technology

ESB-Research Institute

- Innovation in business and enterprises
- Implications of emerging knowledge society
- Processes and consequences of globalization
- Cooperation with partner universities of International Partnership of Business Schools (IPBS)

== Export Academy Baden-Württemberg ==
The Export-Akademie offers a large number of programs for international business which do not lead to academic degrees. Most of these courses are taught or supervised by the teaching staff of the ESB Reutlingen. The Export-Akademie consists of the following departments: SEFEX (Seminars for the Exporting Industry), ZIM (a certificate course for export managers), OBS (a retraining program by the Otto Benecke Trust), and IMI (the International Management Institute).

SEFEX (Seminars for the Exporting Industry) offers seminars over one or several days on special aspects of international business. These are specially designed to meet the needs of small- to medium-size enterprises. University teachers with international experience organize the seminars and deal with the fundamental principles. External lecturers from the business world guarantee a practical orientation and up-to-date information.

ZIM offers systematic part-time training for professionals in international trade. The program can be taken in part or as a whole. It works to a large extent with the study materials of the part-time MBA program of the European School of Business. There are no formal prerequisites for participation in this program. On successful completion, participants are awarded a certificate. Under certain circumstances, participants in the program can go on to study at the Distance Learning University of Switzerland, where they can earn an academic degree.

The OBS program is a business retraining program for economists and engineers who have come to Germany from the ex-Soviet Union. These migrants have completed an academic degree and have work experience which is often very different from what is usual in the German market. The aim of the OBS courses is to remove these obstacles and to adapt the participants to professional requirements in Germany. To achieve this, it also includes trainee programs in German companies.

IMI (the International Management Institute) is designed for managers and specialists from Eastern Europe and from emerging and developing countries. It provides these people with further training in international business and assists in setting up international business academies in these countries. IMI takes on contracts from a number of German and international organizations.

== International ==
The university maintains over 100 partnership and cooperation agreements with universities around the world, overseen by the International Office.

Five universities enjoy major partnerships with Reutlingen University, sending students to and from all departments and in some cases offering special courses on Reutlingen's campus: Swinburne University of Technology (Hawthorn/Melbourne, Australia), Xi'an University of Technology (Xi'an, China), Instituto Tecnológico y de Estudios Superiores de Monterrey (Monterrey, Mexico), Kettering University (Flint, Michigan), and Valparaiso University (Valparaiso, Indiana). Valparaiso University also sends a resident professor to teach and facilitate the program. The Amsterdam Fashion Academy (Oosteinde 1, Amsterdam, the Netherlands) has entered into a student exchange partnership with the Fakultät Textil & Design / School of Textiles & Design Hochschule Reutlingen / Reutlingen University.

The International Office (German Akademisches Auslandsamt) is the major link in Reutlingen for domestic and international students, as well as for academic staff, regarding exchange programs and cooperation agreements with foreign universities and institutions. In addition to its core activities, such as creating and maintaining new study-abroad opportunities for students, the International Office coordinates events such as study-related excursions and company visits, field trips, cinema and international evenings, and receptions.

The services offered by the International Office include the following:

- European and international study-abroad programs for incoming and outgoing students
- Information about degree programs at Reutlingen University, admissions requirements, application and registration procedures, validation of first degrees (for graduate applicants)
- Support for outgoing Reutlingen students, as well as incoming international students, lecturers, and guests on campus
- Information about admission requirements, deadlines and application procedures for periods abroad including study semesters, internship semesters, language courses, and degree theses
- Scholarships and other types of funding for study periods and internships (DAAD, Fulbright, Landesstiftung Baden-Württemberg, InWEnt gGmbH and others)
- Coordination of the awarding of LIFELONG LEARNING and ERASMUS scholarships; information about the EU's LEONARDO DA VINCI program
- Organization of events and excursions via the international circle of InWEnt gGmbH
- Health insurance, visa and residence permit requirements
- International examinations and qualifications such as TOEFL, APIEL, GMAT, GRE, DSH, etc.
- Special language courses, including German as a Foreign Language, Business German, and pre-semester intensive German courses at Reutlingen University
- Assistance with accommodation for international students from partner universities

== Campus Facilities ==
The Protestant and Catholic Student Ministry (ekhg) offers workshops about how to develop and improve the social skills one needs when studying, in one's career, and in one's private life. They attempt to find and live by modern forms of Christian faith, and offer help and advice on both academic and personal matters. The ekhg supports student groups and initiatives, offers help, advice, and companionship in emergencies and personal crises, and arranges contact with German families for foreign students and faculty members. The ekhg is facilitated by the Protestant and Catholic churches.

The University's Computing Center (German Rechenzentrum) operates a series of central servers and a large number of computer labs via a high-speed gigabit network. Altogether, approximately 1600 networked workstations are available to students on campus, as well as campus-wide wireless access.

The University Library holds around 200,000 books and 350 regular periodicals. In addition, a number of specialized databases, 10,000 e-journals, and 4000 ebooks can be accessed on the campus network. The library also provides space for independent study for about 90 readers. The main holdings of older material are literature on textile-related subjects from the 19th to the first half of the 20th century, books that are held by few other German libraries. The textile collection is kept up to this day, though the emphasis has shifted from textile technology to fashion design and textile marketing. Further important subjects are economics, educational studies, psychology, computer science, natural sciences, and German language and literature.

Building 1 (Betriebshalle) houses a unique and comprehensive array of textile machinery used for teaching purposes. The large laboratories for Mechanical Engineering and Chemistry are also located in this building.

The Mensa (Refectory and Cafeteria) is a central meeting point on campus. In addition to coffee and soft drinks, there is a wide range of small snacks, as well as warm dishes and salads during weekday lunchtime. The same building also houses a bookstore and a branch office of the health insurance company AOK, which provides student insurance.

The Student Office (German Studierendenbüro) is a central office for student services, including help with accommodation, changes of address, international student ID cards, sports on campus, reduced ticket prices for local events and sports, and so on.
