= Liette Vasseur =

Canadian biologist

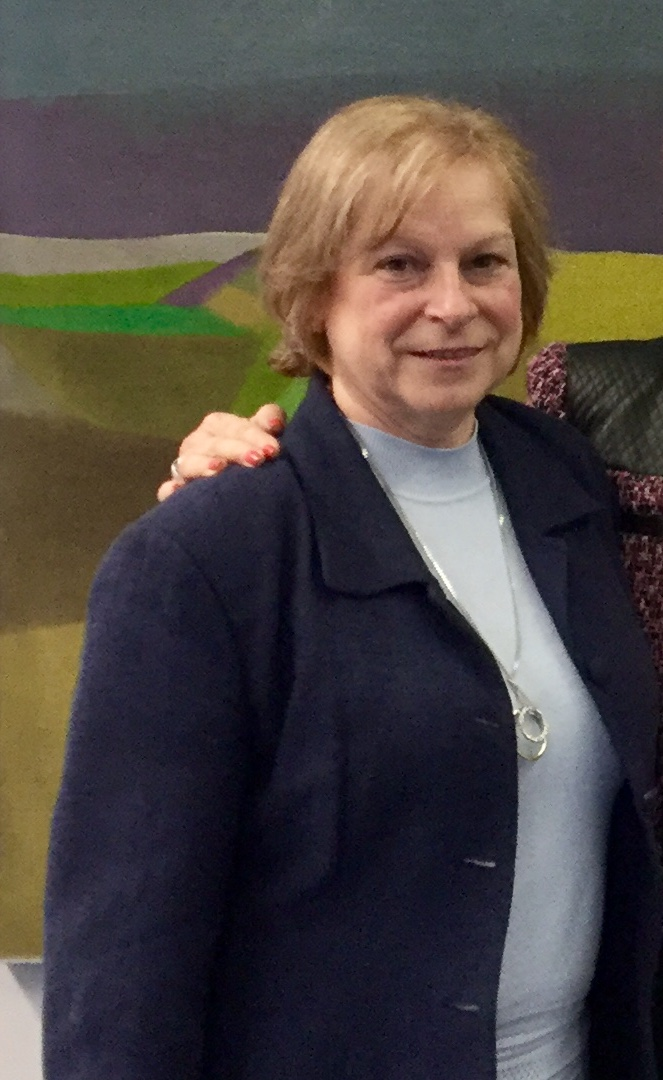
- Liette Vasseur, president of Canadian National Commission to UNESCO
- Born: c. 1963 (age 62–63); Laval, Quebec, Canada
- Occupation: Professor
- Title: President of Canadian National Commission to UNESCO

Academic background
- Education: Queen's University, Canada (PhD); Université du Québec à Montréal(M.Sc.); Université de Sherbrooke(B.Sc.)

Liette Vasseur (born 29 April 1963, in Laval, Quebec) is a Canadian biologist who has held the UNESCO Chair in Community Sustainability: From Local to Global in the Department of Biological Sciences since 2014 (renewed in 2018) at Brock University in St. Catharines, Ontario, Canada. She is also a member of the Women and Gender Studies program and the Environmental Sustainability Research Centre.

== Childhood and education ==
Vasseur was born on April 29, 1963, on a farm in Laval, north of Montreal. Her father and paternal grandfather were florists.

Liette's primary studies began in 1969 at John XXIII School and Simon Vanier School. She did her first two years of secondary school at St-Martin and finally completed her third, fourth and fifth year at St-Maxime. She did her CEGEP at Ahuntsic College.

She graduated from Sherbrooke University with a degree in biology and ecology. She graduated in 1985.

Liette then studied biology at the University of Quebec in Montreal (UQAM) where she graduated in 1987. She then worked on the conservation of wild garlic. She was able to do part of a research team at the Université de Montréal in population genetics with Jean-Pierre Simon.

She then completed her Ph.D. in biology at Queen's University (Kingston, Ontario) and graduated in 1991. She eventually began a postdoctoral fellowship with Catherine Potvin at McGill University.

== Career ==
Vasseur, who trained in Ecology has developed an interdisciplinary research programme with links to issues such as community-based ecosystem management, climate change adaptation and resilience and sustainable agriculture both nationally and internationally.

In Canada, her research areas include impacts of climate change including extreme events on natural and managed ecosystems as well as rural communities, use of new alternatives in sustainable agriculture, and ecosystem/landscape sustainable development, conservation, and resilience in rural communities in Canada and abroad.

She was part of the co-direction committee of a large project on Coastal Communities Challenges in the face of Climate Change, funded by the Social and Humanities Research Council of Canada, which looked at resilience and ecosystem-based adaptations in ten coastal communities of Atlantic Canada.

She also works in China, where she is a Minjiang Scholar at Fujian Agriculture and Forestry University, and in Ecuador, where she focuses on the community sustainability and ecosystem-based adaptation to climate change of rural native communities in the Andean region of the Chimborazo.

Vasseur has also been involved in projects in other countries such as Vietnam, Cambodia, Panama, Brazil, Burkina Faso, in Africa.

From 2018 to 2022 she was the President of the Canadian Commission for UNESCO, where she was previously Chair of the Sectoral Commission on Social, Human and Natural Sciences. She is the vice-chair for North America on the steering committee of the Commission for Ecosystem Management at the International Union for Conservation of Nature and leads the thematic group on Ecosystem Governance.

== Publications ==
She has produced over one hundred publications and more than 250 presentations as a researcher.

1. Vasseur, L. 2018. Learning the role of biodiversity monitoring in a biosphere reserve. International Journal of UNESCO Biosphere Reserves 2 (1) (published April 2018): 18–21.
2. "Use of biological control against arthropod pests in Canadian greenhouse crop production".
3. Vasseur, Liette; Thornbush, Mary; Plante, Steve (25 July 2017). "Climatic and Environmental Changes Affecting Communities in Atlantic Canada". Sustainability. 9 (8): 1293. Bibcode:2017Sust....9.1293V. doi:10.3390/su9081293. hdl:10464/14796.
4. Vasseur, Liette; Horning, Darwin; Thornbush, Mary; Cohen-Shacham, Emmanuelle; Andrade, Angela; Barrow, Ed; Edwards, Steve R.; Wit, Piet; Jones, Mike (22 April 2017). "Complex problems and unchallenged solutions: Bringing ecosystem governance to the forefront of the UN sustainable development goals". Ambio. 46 (7): 731–742. Bibcode:2017Ambio..46..731V. doi:10.1007/s13280-017-0918-6. PMC 5622882. PMID 28434184.
5. Vasseur, Liette; Thornbush, Mary; Plante, Steve (8 October 2015). "Gender-Based Experiences and Perceptions after the 2010 Winter Storms in Atlantic Canada". International Journal of Environmental Research and Public Health. 12 (10): 12518–12529. doi:10.3390/ijerph121012518. PMC 4626983. PMID 26457714.
6. Vasseur, L. 2011. Moving from research into action on issues of climate change for a Canadian community: integration of sciences into decision making. The International Journal of Climate Change: Impacts and Responses 2:115-126.
7. Vasseur, L. 2009. Avant-propos: Interdisciplinarité... ou va-t-on se perdre dans le bois? Revue de l’Université de Moncton 40 : 121-131(published April 2011).
8. Vasseur, L. and W. Hart. 2002. A basic theoretical framework for community-based conservation management in China and Vietnam. International Journal Sustainable Development of World Ecology 9: 41–47. (accepted without revision)
9. Vasseur, L. 2001. Allozymic diversity of Allium tricoccum Solander var. burdickii Hanes in isolated populations of Nova Scotia (Canada). Plant Syst. Evol. 228: 71–79.
10. Vasseur, L., R. Guscott and P. Mudie. 2001. Monitoring of spring flower phenology in Nova Scotia: Trends for the last century. Northeastern Naturalist 8: 393–402.
11. Vasseur, L., C. Cloutier and C. Ansseau. 2000. Effects of repeated sewage sludge application on plant community diversity and structure under agricultural field conditions on Podxolic soils in eastern Quebec. Agriculture, Ecosystem and Environment 81: 209–216.
12. Vasseur, L., B. Shipley and C. Ansseau. 1999. Chemical composition of municipal sewage sludge in southern Quebec: is there a potential for agricultural soil application? Can. J. Wat. Res. 34: 469–480.
13. Vasseur, L., M.J. Fortin and J. Cyr. 1998. The use of clover and cress as two indicator species in the evaluation of impacts of lime sewage sludge and landfill wastewater application on land. The Science of the Total Environment 217: 231–239.
14. Vasseur, L. and C. Potvin. 1998. Changes in pasture community composition under an experimental CO2 enrichment. Plant Ecology 135: 31–41.
15. Vasseur, L., L. Lafrance, D. Renaud, D. Morin, T. Audet and C. Ansseau. 1997. Advisory committee: a powerful tool for helping decision making in environmental issues. Environ. Manag. 21: 359–365.
16. Vasseur, L., C. Cloutier, A. Labelle, J.-N. Duff and C. Ansseau. 1996. Responses of indicator bacteria to forest soil amended municipal sewage sludge from aerated and non-aerated ponds. Env. Poll. 92: 67–72.
17. Vasseur, L., D. Irwin and L.W. Aarssen. 1995. Size versus number of offspring as predictors of success under competition in Lemna minor L. Ann. J. Fenn. 32: 169–178.
18. Vasseur, L., L.W. Aarssen and D.L. Lefebvre. 1995. Plasticity of morphological and allozymic traits in response to short-term environmental variation in Lemna minor. Ecoscience 1(3): 249–254.
19. Vasseur, L. and D. Gagnon. 1994. Factors controlling the survival and growth of transplants of the understory herb Allium tricoccum at the northern limit of its distribution. Biol. Conserv. 68: 107–114.
20. Vasseur, L., T. Bennett and L.W. Aarssen. 1993. Flowering occurrence and allozymic variation in natural populations of Lemna minor L. Amer. J. Bot. 80: 974–979.
21. Vasseur, L. and L.W. Aarssen. 1992. Interpretation of adaptive plasticity in Lemna minor. Oikos 65: 233–241.
22. Vasseur, L. and L.W. Aarssen. 1992. Phenotypic plasticity in a clonal plant, Lemna minor L. Plant Syst. Evol. 180: 205–219.
23. Vasseur, L., L.W. Aarssen and D.D. Lefebvre. 1991. Allozymic and morphometric variation in Lemna minor L. Plant Syst. Evol. 177: 139–148.
24. Vasseur, L., D. Gagnon and J. P. Simon. 1990. Isoenzymatic variability among populations and varieties of wild leek. Biochem. Syst. Ecol. 18: 321- 324.

== Special interests ==
Vasseur is also very involved in issues related to women in science, engineering, trades and technology. On this topic, she has produced several publications on this topic as well as organized some events and projects to promote gender equality. She is the Past-President (President from 2014 to 2018) of the Canadian Coalition of Women in Engineering, Science, Trades and Technology.
