= Lorraine Janzen Kooistra =

Canadian professor of English

- Spouse: John Peter Kooistra
- Children: 2

Academic background
- Education: BA., 1977, Brock University; MA., PhD., McMaster University
- Thesis: The artist as critic: bi-textuality in fin-de-si'ecle illustrated books. (1994)

Academic work
- Discipline: Literature
- Institutions: Nipissing University; Toronto Metropolitan University
- Main interests: Victorian poetry

Lorraine Janzen Kooistra FRSC is a Canadian professor of English and a member of the Yeates School of Graduate Studies at Toronto Metropolitan University (formerly Ryerson University). She is the founding co-director of TMU's Centre for Digital Humanities. She was elected a fellow of the Royal Society of Canada in 2018.

== Early life and education ==
Janzen Kooistra is a first-generation Canadian. She was born to parents John G. Janzen and Irma Marie Koop and has three siblings.

Janzen Kooistra earned her Bachelor of Arts, with honours, from Brock University and her Master's degree and PhD from McMaster University.

== Career ==
While earning her Bachelor of Arts, Janzen Kooistra earned a job with the Lincoln County Board of Education as a teacher from 1973 to 1975. From there, she earned a postdoctoral fellowship at the University of Toronto between 1977 and 1979. Beginning at the turn of the 1990s, Janzen Kooistra worked as an assistant professor at Nipissing University. In 1999, Janzen Kooistra published The culture of Christina Rossetti: Female poetics and Victorian contexts, which was an analysis of poet Christina Rossetti's work. Two years later, while working at Nipissing University, Janzen Kooistra was awarded the Chancellor's Award for Excellence in Research. She continued her examination into Rossetti's poetry by publishing Christina Rossetti and illustration: a publishing history in 2003.

Janzen Kooistra was hired by Ryerson University in 2005 to serve as the Chair of their English department. She served in this role until 2008 before becoming the English department's first Undergraduate Program Director in 2010. While in her role as Chair, Janzen Kooistra was appointed to the North American Victorian Studies Association Advisory Board in 2009 and again in 2012. In 2010, Janzen Kooistra helped found Ryerson's Centre for Digital Humanities and later the Children's Literature Archive.

While working as Ryerson's Undergraduate English Program Director in 2012, Janzen Kooistra was awarded the Provost's Experiential Teaching Award for her teaching style and was a recipient of the Ontario Confederation of University Faculty Associations Teaching Award. That year, Janzen Kooistra published Poetry, Pictures, and Popular Publishing: the Illustrated Gift Book and Victorian Visual Culture, 1855-1875.

In 2016, while working as the principal investigator on "Visualizing the Unmarked: The Social Politics of Fin-de-siècle Periodicals and Digital Humanities Mark-up Practices," Janzen Kooistra was awarded the 2016 President's Award for Excellence in Teaching by Ryerson University.

In 2018, Janzen Kooistra was elected a fellow of the Royal Society of Canada for her work in 19th century literature.

== Selected publications ==
The following is a list of publications:

- Poetry, Pictures, and Popular Publishing : the Illustrated Gift Book and Victorian Visual Culture, 1855-1875 (2014)
- Victorian poetry and the book arts (2010)
- Learning to see in the dark (2003)
- Christina Rossetti and illustration: a publishing history (2003)
- The culture of Christina Rossetti: Female poetics and Victorian contexts (1999)
