= IFAC Member Bodies and Associates =

International Federation of Accountants

IFAC Member Bodies and Associates are accounting organizations that are members of the International Federation of Accountants (IFAC) or that are associated with IFAC.

IFAC members are:

Country	Status	Acronym	Organization
Albania	Member	IEKA	Institute of Authorized Chartered Auditors of Albania
Albania	Member		Instituti i Kontabilistëve të Miratuar (Albanian Institute of Certified Accountants)
Argentina	Member		Federación Argentina de Consejos Profesionales de Ciencias Económicas
Armenia	Member	CAA	Chamber of Auditors and Expert Accountants of Armenia
Australia	Member	CPA Australia	CPA Australia
Australia	Member	CAANZ	Chartered Accountants Australia and New Zealand
Australia	Member	IPA	Institute of Public Accountants
Austria	Member	IOW	Institut Österreichischer Wirtschaftsprüfer
Austria	Member		Kammer der Wirtschaftstreuhänder
Azerbaijan	Member		Chamber of Auditors of Azerbaijan Republic
Bahamas	Member	BICA	Bahamas Institute of Chartered Accountants
Bahrain	Member	BAA	Bahrain Accountants Association
Bangladesh	Member	ICAB	Institute of Chartered Accountants of Bangladesh
Bangladesh	Member	ICMAB	Institute of Cost and Management Accountants of Bangladesh
Barbados	Member	ICAB	Institute of Chartered Accountants of Barbados
Belgium	Member		Institut des Experts Comptables et des Conseils Fiscaux
Belgium	Member		Institut des Réviseurs d'Entreprises
Bolivia	Member		Colegio de Auditores de Bolivia
Bosnia and Herzegovina	Member		Association of Accountants and Auditors of Republic of Srpska
Bosnia and Herzegovina	Associate		Union of Accountants, Auditors and Financial Workers of Federation of Bosnia and Herzegovina
Botswana	Member		Botswana Institute of Chartered Accountants
Brazil	Member	CFC	Conselho Federal de Contabilidade
Brazil	Member	IBRACON	Instituto dos Auditores Independentes do Brasil
Brunei Darussalam	Associate		Brunei Darussalam Institute of Certified Public Accountants
Bulgaria	Member		Institute of Certified Public Accountants of Bulgaria
Cambodia	Associate	KICPAA	Kampuchea Institute of Certified Public Accountants and Auditors
Cameroon	Member		Institute of Chartered Accountants of Cameroon
Canada	Member	CPA Canada	CPA Canada
Cayman Islands	Associate	CISPA	Cayman Islands Society of Professional Accountants
Chile	Member		Colegio de Contadores de Chile
China	Member	CICPA	Chinese Institute of Certified Public Accountants
Colombia	Member		Instituto Nacional de Contadores Públicos de Colombia
Costa Rica	Member		Colegio de Contadores Públicos de Costa Rica
Ivory Coast	Member		Ordre des Experts Comptables et Comptables Agréés de Côte d'Ivoire
Croatia	Member		Croatian Association of Accountants and Financial Experts
Croatia	Associate		Croatian Audit Chamber
Cyprus	Member		Institute of Certified Public Accountants of Cyprus
Czech Republic	Member		Chamber of Auditors of the Czech Republic
Czech Republic	Member		Union of Accountants of the Czech Republic
Denmark	Member		Foreningen af Statsautoriserede Revisorer
Denmark	Member		Foreningen Registrerede Revisorer
Dominican Republic	Member		Instituto de Contadores Públicos Autorizados de la República Dominicana
Egypt	Member		Egyptian Society of Accountants & Auditors
Estonia	Member		Estonian Association of Auditors
Fiji	Member		Fiji Institute of Accountants
Finland	Member	HTM	HTM-tilintarkastajat ry GRM-revisorer rf (Auditors Association)
Finland	Member	KHT	KHT-yhdistys - Föreningen CGR ry (Chartered Public Accountants Association)
France	Member		Compagnie Nationale des Commissaires aux Comptes
France	Member	OEC	Conseil Supérieur de l'Ordre des Experts-Comptables
Georgia	Member		Georgian Federation of Professional Accountants and Auditors
Germany	Member	IDW	Institut der Wirtschaftsprüfer
Germany	Member	WPK	Wirtschaftsprüferkammer
Ghana	Member	ICAG	Institute of Chartered Accountants (Ghana)
Greece	Member	SOEL	Institute of Certified Public Accountants of Greece
Guatemala	Member		Instituto Guatemalteco de Contadores Públicos y Auditores
Guyana	Member	ICAG	Institute of Chartered Accountants of Guyana
Haiti	Member		Ordre des Comptables Professionels Agrees d'Haiti
Honduras	Member		Colegio de Peritos Mercantiles y Contadores Públicos
Hong Kong	Member	HKICPA	Hong Kong Institute of Certified Public Accountants
Hungary	Member		Chamber of Hungarian Auditors
Iceland	Member	FLE	Félag Löggiltra Endurskoðenda
India	Member	ICAI	Institute of Chartered Accountants of India
India	Member	ICMAI	Institute of Cost Accountants of India
Indonesia	Member	IAI	Indonesian Institute of Accountants (Ikatan Akuntan Indonesia)
Iran	Member	IACPA	Iranian Association of Certified Public Accountants
Iran	Member	IICA	Iranian Institute of Certified Accountants
Iraq	Member	IUAA	Iraqi Union of Accountants and Auditors
Ireland	Associate	IATI	Accounting Technicians Ireland
Ireland	Member	CAI	Chartered Accountants Ireland
Ireland	Member	CPA	Institute of Certified Public Accountants in Ireland
Israel	Member		Institute of Certified Public Accountants in Israel
Italy	Member		Consiglio Nazionale dei Dottori Commercialisti e degli Esperti Contabili
Jamaica	Member	ICAJ	Institute of Chartered Accountants of Jamaica
Japan	Member	JICPA	Japanese Institute of Certified Public Accountants
Jordan	Member		Arab Society of Certified Accountants
Jordan	Member		Jordanian Association of Certified Public Accountants
Kazakhstan	Member		Chamber of Auditors of the Republic of Kazakhstan
Kenya	Member		Institute of Certified Public Accountants of Kenya
Korea, Republic of	Member		Korean Institute of Certified Public Accountants
Kosovo	Member	SCAAK	Society of Certified Accountants and Auditors of Kosovo
Kuwait	Member	KWAAA	Kuwait Association of Accountants and Auditors
Kyrgyzstan	Associate		Union of Accountants and Auditors
Latvia	Member	LZRA	Latvian Association of Certified Auditors
Lebanon	Member	LACPA	Lebanese Association of Certified Public Accountants
Lesotho	Member	LIA	Lesotho Institute of Accountants
Liberia	Member	LICPA	Liberian Institute of Certified Public Accountants
Lithuania	Member	LCA	Lithuanian Chamber of Auditors
Luxembourg	Member	IRE	Institut des Réviseurs d'Entreprises
Luxembourg	Associate	OEC	Ordre des Experts-Comptables du Luxembourg
Madagascar	Member	OECFM	Ordre des Experts Comptables et Financiers de Madagascar
Malawi	Member	SOCAM	Society of Accountants in Malawi
Malaysia	Member	MIA	Malaysian Institute of Accountants
Malaysia	Member	MICPA	Malaysian Institute of Certified Public Accountants
Malta	Member	MIA	Malta Institute of Accountants
Mauritius	Associate	MIPA	Mauritius Institute of Professional Accountants
Mexico	Member	IMCP	Instituto Mexicano de Contadores Públicos
Moldova	Member	ACAP RM	Association of Professional Accountants & Auditors of the Republic of Moldova
Mongolia	Associate	MonICPA	Mongolian Institute of Certified Public Accountants
Montenegro	Associate	IAAM	Institute of Accountants and Auditors of Montenegro
Morocco	Member	OEC	Ordre des Experts Comptables du Maroc
Namibia	Member	ICAN	Institute of Chartered Accountants of Namibia
Nepal	Member	ICAN	Institute of Chartered Accountants of Nepal
Netherlands	Member	Royal NIVRA	Koninklijk Nederlands Instituut van Registeraccountants
Netherlands	Affiliate	NOREA	Nederlandse Orde van Register EDP-Auditors
New Zealand	Member	CAANZ	Chartered Accountants Australia and New Zealand
Nicaragua	Member	CCPN	Colegio de Contadores Públicos de Nicaragua
Nigeria	Member	ANAN	Association of National Accountants of Nigeria
Nigeria	Member	ICAN	Institute of Chartered Accountants of Nigeria
North Macedonia	Associate	ICARM	Institute of Certified Auditors of the Republic of Macedonia
Norway	Member	DNR	Den Norske Revisorforening
Pakistan	Member	ICAP	Institute of Chartered Accountants of Pakistan
Pakistan	Member	ICMAP	Institute of Cost and Management Accountants of Pakistan
Pakistan	Member	PIPFA	Pakistan Institute of Public Finance Accountants
Panama	Member	CCPAP	Colegio de Contadores Públicos Autorizados de Panamá
Papua New Guinea	Associate	CPAPNG	Certified Practising Accountants Papua New Guinea
Paraguay	Member	CCP	Colegio de Contadores de Paraguay
Peru	Suspended		Junta de Decanos de Colegios de Contadores Publicos del Peru
Philippines	Member	PICPA	Philippine Institute of Certified Public Accountants
Poland	Member		Accountants Association in Poland
Poland	Member		National Chamber of Statutory Auditors
Portugal	Member	OROC	Ordem dos Revisores Oficiais de Contas
Portugal	Member	OTOC	Ordem dos Técnicos Oficiais de Contas
Qatar	Member	QCPA	Qatar Association of Certified Public Accountants
Romania	Member		Chamber of Financial Auditors of Romania
Romania	Member	CECCAR	Body of Expert and Licensed Accountants of Romania
Russian Federation	Associate		Audit Chamber of Russia
Russian Federation	Member		Institute of Professional Accountants of Russia
Russian Federation	Member		Russian Collegium of Auditors
Saudi Arabia	Member		Saudi Organization for Certified Public Accountants
Senegal	Associate	ONECCA	Ordre National des Experts Comptables et Comptables Agréés du Sénégal
Serbia	Member		Serbian Association of Accountants and Auditors
Sierra Leone	Member	ICASL	Institute of Chartered Accountants of Sierra Leone
Singapore	Member	ISCA	Institute of Singapore Chartered Accountants
Slovakia	Member		Slovenska Komora Auditorov
Slovenia	Member		Slovenian Institute of Auditors
South Africa	Member	SAICA	South African Institute of Chartered Accountants
South Africa	Member	SAIPA	South African Institute of Professional Accountants
Spain	Member		Instituto de Censores Jurados de Cuentas de España
Sri Lanka	Member	AATSL	Association of Accounting Technicians of Sri Lanka
Sri Lanka	Member		Institute of Certified Management Accountants of Sri Lanka
Sri Lanka	Member	ICASL	Institute of Chartered Accountants of Sri Lanka
Swaziland	Member		Swaziland Institute of Accountants
Sweden	Member		Far
Switzerland	Member		Treuhand-Kammer -Swiss Institute of Certified Accountants and Tax Consultants
Taiwan	Member	FCPAACT	Federation of CPA Associations of Chinese Taiwan
Tanzania	Member	NBAA	National Board of Accountants and Auditors
Thailand	Member		Federation of Accounting Professions
Trinidad and Tobago	Member	ICATT	Institute of Chartered Accountants of Trinidad & Tobago
Tunisia	Member	OECT	Ordre des Experts Comptables de Tunisie
Turkey	Member		Expert Accountants' Association of Turkey
Turkey	Member	TÜRMOB	Union of Chambers of Certified Public Accountants of Turkey
Uganda	Member		Institute of Certified Public Accountants of Uganda
Ukraine	Associate		Ukrainian Association of Certified Accountants and Auditors
Ukraine	Member		Ukrainian Federation of Professional Accountants and Auditors
United Arab Emirates	Associate	EAAA	Emirates Association for Accountants & Auditors
United Kingdom	Affiliate	ACT	Association of Corporate Treasurers
United Kingdom	Member	AAT	Association of Accounting Technicians
United Kingdom	Member	ACCA	Association of Chartered Certified Accountants
United Kingdom	Member	CIMA	Chartered Institute of Management Accountants
United Kingdom	Member	CIPFA	Chartered Institute of Public Finance and Accountancy
United Kingdom	Member	ICAEW	Institute of Chartered Accountants in England and Wales
United Kingdom	Member	ICAS	Institute of Chartered Accountants of Scotland
United Kingdom	Member	IFA	Institute of Financial Accountants
United States	Member	AICPA	American Institute of Certified Public Accountants
United States	Member	IMA	Institute of Management Accountants
United States	Affiliate	ISACA	Information Systems Audit and Control Association
United States	Affiliate	IIA	Institute of Internal Auditors
United States	Affiliate	NASBA	National Association of State Boards of Accountancy
Uruguay	Member	CCEAU	Colegio de Contadores, Economistas y Administradores del Uruguay
Uzbekistan	Associate		National Association of Accountants and Auditors of Uzbekistan
Vietnam	Member		Vietnam Accounting Association
Zambia	Member	ZICA	Zambia Institute of Chartered Accountants
Zimbabwe	Member	ICAZ	Institute of Chartered Accountants of Zimbabwe

== See also ==
- International Federation of Francophone Accountants
