= Institute of Cost and Management Accountants of Pakistan =

Professional body in Pakistan

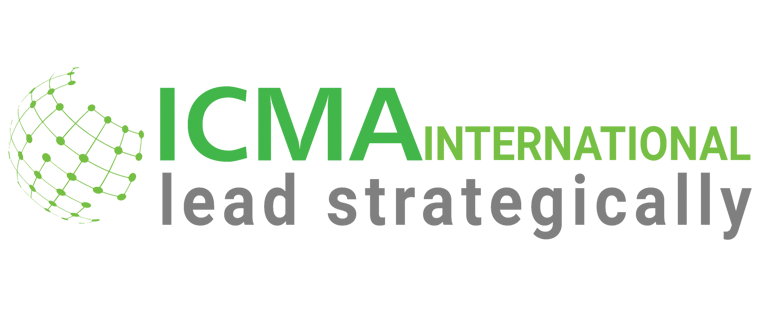
- Abbreviation: ICMA Pakistan
- Formation: May 23, 1951, 75 years ago
- Headquarters: ICMAP Building, ST-18/C ICMAP Avenue, Block 6 Gulshan-e-Iqbal, Karachi - 75300
- Locations: U.A.E, KSA, UK, Canada, Australia, USA, Qatar
- Campuses: 11
- Coordinates: 24° 55' 10.63" N, 67° 5' 50.35" E
- Membership: over 7,000
- Official Language: English, Urdu
- President: Azeem Hussain Siddiqui, FCMA
- Vice President: Muhammad Yasin, FCMA
- Executive Director: Amir Ijaz Khan, FCMA
- Affiliations: International Federation of Accountants (IFAC), South Asian Federation of Accountants (SAFA)
- Students: approx. 15,000
- Website: https://www.icmainternational.com

The Institute of Cost and Management Accountants of Pakistan (ICMAP) is a professional accounting body offering qualification and training in management accountancy.

The Institute of Cost and Management Accountants of Pakistan was established in 1951 and was granted statutory status under the Cost and Management Accountants Act, 1966 for the regulation of the profession of Cost and Management Accounting. ICMAP is a full member of International Federation of Accountants (IFAC), International Accounting Standards Board (IASB), Confederation of Asian and Pacific Accountants (CAPA) and South Asian Federation of Accountants (SAFA).

== Presidents ==
The following is a list of presidents of the institute:

Year	Name	Role	Organization
1951–1955	Muhammad Shoaib	Founder President, Finance Minister	Finance Minister of Pakistan
1956–1962	Mumtaz Mirza	Secretary	Ministry of Finance, Govt. of Pakistan
1963–1965	Mushtaq Ahmed	Controller & Auditor General	Govt. of Pakistan
1966–1969	Muhammad Shoaib	Founder President, Finance Minister	Finance Minister of Pakistan
1970–1972	Iqbal Ahmed	Secretary and Chief Accountant	Sui Gas Transmission Company
1973–1975	Muhammed Yakub	Secretary	Ministry of Commerce, Govt. of Pakistan
1976–1978	Khurshid Ahmed	Managing Director	Pak Glass Ltd.
1979–1990	Riaz Ahmed Bokhari	Controller & Auditor General	Govt. of Pakistan
1991–1996	Mian Mumtaz Abdullah	Chairman	CLA (Now SECP)
1997–1999	Prof. Dr. Khawaja Amjad Saeed	Pro-Vice Chancellor	University of the Punjab
2000	M. H. Asif	General Manager (Management Services)	Sui Southern Gas Company Limited
2001	M. Ashraf Bawany	Deputy General Manager Finance	BOC Pakistan Limited
2002	Badruddin Fakhri	Director (Finance & Admin)	Pioneer Cement Limited
2003–2004	Sher Afgan Malik	Director	Adept (Pvt.) Ltd.
2005	Muhammed Rafi	General Manager Finance	Oil & Gas Development Company Ltd
2006–2008	Sher Afgan Malik	Director	Adept (Pvt.) Ltd.
2009–2011	Hasan A. Bilgrami	President & Chief Executive Officer	Bank Islami Pakistan Limited
2012–2014	Zia-ul-Mustafa Awan	CFO & Business Administrator	Expo Lahore (Pvt.) Limited
2015–2016	Kashif Mateen Ansari	Chief Executive Officer	Sachal Energy Development (Pvt) Limited
2016–2017	Mohammad Iqbal Ghori	Director Strategic Planning & CFO	Sadaqat Limited
2018-2022	Zia-ul-Mustafa Awan	CFO & Business Administrator	Expo Lahore (Pvt.) Limited
2022-2025	Shehzad Ahmed Malik	CEO	SMNCO

== Council members and government nominees ==
The council is a supreme decision-making body of the institute. Being at the helm of affairs, it is responsible for overall management of the institute. The Council performs its responsibilities under the Act and Regulations which authorizes it for managing resources /affairs of all kinds. The council is for three years. It has twelve members, eight of whom are elected by the members of the Institute and four are nominated by the Government of Pakistan. The nominees usually belonged to Ministry of Finance (MoF), Securities and Exchange Commission of Pakistan (SECP), Auditor General of Pakistan (AGP), Federal Board of Revenue (FBR), State Bank of Pakistan (SBP) and any other government regulatory bodies.

The office bearers of National Council are President, Vice President, Secretary and Treasurer, who are elected from amongst members of the council. The President acts as Chief Executive of the council. As of 2024, Council members of the Institute are as follows:

=== Office bearers ===
1. Ghulam Mustafa Qazi, FCMA (President)
2. Muhammad Yasin, FCMA (Vice President)
3. Azeem Hussain Siddiqui, FCMA (Honorary Secretary)
4. Abdul Qayyum, FCMA (Honorary Treasurer)

=== Council members ===
1. Shehzad Ahmed Malik, FCMA CEO, Shehzad Malik Co Management Consultants
2. Shaham Ahmed, FCMA GM Finance, Suzuki Motors Pakistan
3. Intzar Hussain, FCMA Finance Manager, Abu Dhabi National Paper Mill
4. Marryum Pervaiz, FCMA Director, Competition Commission of Pakistan

=== Government Nominees ===
The current government nominees are

1. Saleemullah, FCMA Deputy Governor, State Bank of Pakistan
2. Abdul Rehman Warraich Commissioner, Securities and Exchange Commission of Pakistan
3. Muhammad Kamran Shahzad, ACMA Deputy Chief Cost Accounts Officer, Finance Division Government of Pakistan
4. (Vacant), Deputy Auditor General (Policy), Auditor General of Pakistan

== Members ==
ICMAP has over 7,000 members, out of which % working abroad.

=== Overseas members ===
Region	Number of members
Middle East & Gulf Countries	%
USA & Canada	%
Europe	%
Australia	%
Others	%

== Campuses ==
- Faisalabad
- Hyderabad
- Islamabad
- Karachi
- Lahore
- Multan
- Peshawar
- Quetta
- Sukkur

== Publications ==
The Institute produces a diverse range of publications that cater to the needs of its members, students, and the wider professional community:

- The official flagship journal of ICMAP – CHARTERED MANAGEMENT ACCOUNTANT
- ICMA's Students’ e-magazine
- Newsletter

== International affiliations ==
The ICMAP is a member of:

- Confederation of Asian and Pacific Accountants (CAPA)
- International Accounting Standards Board (IASB)
- International Federation of Accountants (IFAC)
- South Asian Federation of Accountants (SAFA)

== Overseas Branch Councils ==
ICMAP has seven overseas branch councils.

1. Australia
2. Canada
3. Qatar
4. Kingdom of Saudi Arabia
5. United Arab Emirates
6. United Kingdom
7. United States of America

== See also ==
- Association of Chartered Certified Accountants
- International Federation of Accountants
- Pakistan Institute of Public Finance Accountants
- Securities and Exchange Commission of Pakistan

V · T · E	IFAC Member Bodies and Associates	[hide]
Asia	IICA · ICAI · ICMAI (formerly ICWAI) · ICAN · ICASL · ICMASL · ICAB · ICMAB · ICMAP · ICAP · ICPAI · PIPFA · MIA · CICPA · HKICPA · ISCA · PICPA · IUAA · IAI · JICPA	
Africa	LICPA · ICAG · ICPAK · ICAN · ICAN · ICASL · ONECCA · SAICA · SAIPA · NBAA · OECT · ICPAU · ICAZ	
Europe	AAT · ACCA · CA Ireland · CPA Ireland · CIMA · CIPFA · ICAEW · ICAS · IDW · IEKA · IFA · OEC · KSW	
Americas	AICPA · IMA · BICA · CPA Canada · CISPA · ICAB · ICAG · ICAJ · ICATT	
Oceania	CA ANZ · CPA Australia · IPA	
