= List of accountancy bodies =

This is a list of the various professional bodies and organisations that seek to provide regulation and oversight over individuals and firms operating in the accountancy industry.

== Accounting standard-setting bodies ==
Accounting standard setting bodies are national or international organisations that have been delegated responsibility for setting Generally Accepted Accounting Principles by statute in a country or jurisdiction.

- International
  - The International Accounting Standards Board issues IFRS
  - The International Federation of Accountants (with its International Public Sector Accounting Standards Board - IPSASB) issues IPSAS for Government/Public entities accounting.
  - The IFRS Foundation
- Albania
  - Albanian National Accounting Council
- Australia
  - Australian Accounting Standards Board
- Bhutan
  - Accounting and Auditing Standard Board of Bhutan
- Botswana
  - Botswana Institute of Chartered Accountants
- Canada
  - CICA's Accounting Standards Board "AcSB"
- France
  - Autorité des Normes Comptables (ANC) (formerly the Conseil National de la Comptabilité)
- Germany
  - Accounting Standards Committee of Germany (ASCG, in German: DRSC)
- India
  - National Advisory Committee on Accounting Standards (NACAS) with the aide and advice of Institute of Chartered Accountants of India and Institute of Cost Accountants of India
- Iran
  - Accounting Standards Board
- Ireland
  - Irish Auditing and Accounting Supervisory Authority
- Malaysia
  - Malaysian Accounting Standards Board
- Malta
  - Maltese Accountancy Board
- New Zealand
  - Accounting Standards Review Board
- Nigeria
  - Institution of Chartered Accountants of Nigeria (ICAN)
  - Association of National Accountants of Nigeria (ANAN)
- Pakistan
  - The Institute of Certified General Accountants (CGA-Pakistan)
- Philippines
  - Financial Reporting Standards Council (FRSC)
- Saudi Arabia
  - Saudi Organization for Certified Public Accountants (SOCPA)
- South Africa
  - South African Institute of Chartered Accountants (SAICA)
  - South African Institute of Professional Accountants (SAIPA)
  - Chartered Institute for Business Accountants (CIBA)
- United Kingdom and Ireland
  - Accounting Standards Board
- United States
  - National Association of State Boards of Accountancy (NASBA)
  - Financial Accounting Standards Board (FASB)
  - AICPA Accounting Principles Board (APB)
  - Governmental Accounting Standards Board (GASB)
  - Federal Accounting Standards Advisory Board (FASAB)

== Professional bodies ==
Professional bodies represent the interests of their members by lobbying governments, and provide the framework for self-regulation where this is permitted by statute. Professional bodies are also responsible for administering training and examinations for students and members.

The primary bodies in each country are affiliated to the International Federation of Accountants while a few do not belong to IFAC as they operate more like specialist bodies helping the work of accountants and auditors such as the field of taxation, forensic auditing and systems auditing. These bodies include:

- The Association of Certified Public Accountants (ICPAGLOBAL)
- The Institute of Certified Public Accountants (CPA India)
- Institute of Chartered Tax Practitioners India (ICTPI)
- Association of Chartered Certified Accountants (ACCA)
- American Institute of Certified Public Accountants (AICPA)
- Association of Accountancy Bodies in West Africa (ABWA)
- Association of Accounting Technicians (AAT)
- Institute of Chartered Accountants Ghana (ICAG)
- Institute of Certified Public Accountants of Kenya
- Association of International Accountants (AIA)
- Association of National Accountants of Nigeria (ANAN)
- Botswana Institute of Chartered Accountants (BICA)
- Chartered Accountants Australia and New Zealand (CAANZ)
- Chartered Institute of Management Accountants (CIMA)
- Chartered Institute of Public Finance and Accountancy (CIPFA)
- Chartered Professional Accountants of Canada (CPA Canada)
- CPA Australia
- Florida Institute of CPAs
- Hong Kong Institute of Certified Public Accountants (HKICPA)
- Institute of Chartered Accountants in England and Wales (ICAEW)
- Institute of Certified Public Accountants in Ireland (CPA)
- Chartered Accountants Ireland (CAI)
- Institute of Cost Accountants of India (ICMAI)
- Institute of Chartered Accountants of India (ICAI)
- Institute of Chartered Accountants of Nepal (ICAN)
- Institute of Cost and Management Accountants of Bangladesh (ICMAB)
- Institute of Chartered Accountants of Nigeria (ICAN)
- Institute of Chartered Accountants of Pakistan (ICAP)
- Institute of Cost and Management Accountants of Pakistan (ICMAP)
- Institute of Chartered Accountants of Bangladesh (ICAB)
- Institute of Chartered Accountants of Scotland (ICAS)
- Institute of Chartered Accountants of Sri Lanka (ICASL)
- Institute of Chartered Accountants of Zimbabwe (ICAZ)
- Institute of Financial Accountants (IFA)
- Institute of Management Accountants (IMA)
- Institute of Public Accountants (IPA)
- Institute of Singapore Chartered Accountants (ISCA)
- Malaysian Institute of Accountants
- Ordre des Experts Comptables de Tunisie
- Philippine Institute of Certified Public Accountants
- South African Institute of Chartered Accountants (SAICA)
- South African Institute of Professional Accountants (SAIPA)
- Chartered Institute for Business Accountants (CIBA)
- United Arab Emirates Chartered Accountants (UAECA)
- The Institute of Certified Public Accountants of Indonesia (IAPI)

== Oversight boards ==
Following the Enron scandal some countries removed or limited auditors' rights to self-regulation and set up independent, not-for-profit organisations to regulate the conduct of auditors. (In the EU it is compulsory to have a dedicated supervisory authority, cf. 8th European Directive).

- International
  - The Public Interest Oversight Board provides oversight of the standards-setting bodies within the International Federation of Accountants
- France
  - Haut Conseil du Commissariat aux Comptes (HCCC)
- Germany
  - German Auditor Oversight Commission (in German: APAK)
- Hong Kong
  - Accounting and Financial Reporting Council (AFRC)
- Ireland
  - Irish Auditing and Accounting Supervisory Authority
- United Kingdom
  - Professional Oversight Team (Financial Reporting Council)
- United States
  - Public Company Accounting Oversight Board

== Auditing standards-setting bodies ==
Pronouncements by the International Auditing and Assurance Standards Board (IAASB) govern audit, review and other assurance services conducted in accordance with international standards. Most countries that have adopted the International Standards on Auditing (ISAs) still retain the national auditing standards setting body to enact the international standards in their country.

- International
  - International Auditing and Assurance Standards Board (IAASB) of the International Federation of Accountants (IFAC).
  - Forensic Auditors Certification Board (FACB)
  - INTOSAI for Government auditing by Supreme Audit Institutions (SAI)
- Australia
  - AUASB - Auditing & Assurance Standards Board
- Canada
  - Canadian Auditing and Assurance Standards Board
- France
  - Compagnie nationale des commissaires aux comptes (CNCC)
  - Ordre des Experts-Comptables (OEC)
  - Institut Francais des Auditeurs et Controleurs Internes (IFACI) (Unregulated Internal Auditing Guidelines)
- Hong Kong
  - Hong Kong Institute of Certified Public Accountants
- India

National accounting standard setting board. NACAS.

- Malaysia
  - Malaysian Institute of Accountants
- Nepal
  - Institute of Chartered Accountants of Nepal
- Philippines
  - Auditing and Assurance Standards Council (AASC)
- South Africa
  - Public Accountants and Auditors Board
- United Kingdom and Ireland
  - Auditing Practices Board
- United States
  - Public Company Accounting Oversight Board - public companies
  - American Institute of Certified Public Accountants - general
  - Government Accountability Office - recipients of federal grants and government organizations
  - Institute of Internal Auditors (IIA) (Unregulated Internal Auditing Guidelines)
  - Information Systems Audit and Control Association (ISACA) (Unregulated Information System Internal Auditing Guidelines)

== See also ==
- Accountancy
- Audit
- International Standards on Auditing
- IFAC Member Bodies and Associates
