= Institute of Chartered Accountants =

Institute of Chartered Accountants may refer to:

- Institute of Chartered Accountants in Australia
- Institute of Chartered Accountants of Bangladesh
- Institute of Chartered Accountants of Barbados
- Institute of Chartered Accountants in England and Wales
- Institute of Chartered Accountants of Ghana
- Institute of Chartered Accountants of Guyana
- Institute of Chartered Accountants of India
- Institute of Chartered Accountants in Ireland
- Institute of Chartered Accountants of Namibia
- Institute of Chartered Accountants of Nepal
- Institute of Chartered Accountants of Nigeria
- Institute of Chartered Accountants of Pakistan
- Institute of Chartered Accountants of Scotland
- Institute of Chartered Accountants of Sierra Leone
- Institute of Chartered Accountants of Sri Lanka
- Institute of Chartered Accountants of Zimbabwe

or:

- Bahamas Institute of Chartered Accountants
- Canadian Institute of Chartered Accountants
- New Zealand Institute of Chartered Accountants
- South African Institute of Chartered Accountants
