= Chartered accountant =

Professional designation for accountants

Chartered accountant is an internationally recognised professional designation, generally equivalent to certified public accountant. Chartered accountants work in all fields of business and finance, including auditing, taxation, financial and general management. Some are engaged in public practice work, others work in the private sector and some are employed by government bodies.

Chartered accountants were the first accountants to form a professional accounting body, initially established in Scotland in 1854. The Edinburgh Society of Accountants (1854), the Glasgow Institute of Accountants and Actuaries (1854) and the Aberdeen Society of Accountants (1867) were each granted a royal charter almost from their inception. Women were able to become chartered accountants following the Sex Disqualification (Removal) Act 1919 after which, in 1920, Mary Harris Smith was recognised by the Institute of Chartered Accountants in England and Wales and became the first woman chartered accountant in the world.

Chartered accountants' institutes require members to undertake a minimum level of continuing professional development to stay professionally competitive. They facilitate special interest groups (for instance, entertainment and media, or insolvency and restructuring) which lead in their fields. They provide support to members by offering advisory services, technical helplines and technical libraries. They also offer opportunities for professional networking, career and business development.

Chartered Accountants Worldwide comprises 15 institutes with over 1.8 million Chartered Accountants and students in 190 countries.

== Countries ==
Albania

The Institute of Authorized Chartered Auditors of Albania (Instituti i Ekspertëve Kontabël të Autorizuar - IEKA) is a professional body that regulates the accountancy industry in Albania. IEKA was established on 24 November 1997 as a non-profit professional association for Certified Public Accountants (CPAs) who practice their profession in public. At foundation, IEKA had 56 CPAs. By 2011 the institute had 151 members from 43 auditing companies. The institute was created as a joint initiative by the Albanian government and the World Bank, and is the only licensed body of accountants in the country. IEKA became a member of the International Federation of Accountants (IFAC) in May 2000. IEKA is also a member of the Federation Internationale des Experts-Comptables Francophone (FIDEF) and the South East European Partnership on Accountancy Development (SEEPAD).

=== Australia ===
Chartered accountants of Australia belong to the Chartered Accountants Australia & New Zealand (CA ANZ, formerly the Institute of Chartered Accountants in Australia) and use the designatory letters CA. Some senior members (at least 15 years' membership) of the institute may be elected fellows and use the letters FCA. Of equal legal status and recognition in Australia as qualified professional accountants are Institute of Public Accountants (IPA) and CPA Australia. On 28 June 2016, the Association of Chartered Certified Accountants (ACCA) and CA ANZ announced a strategic alliance to provide an opportunity for dual membership of both bodies, which will add value for the members locally and globally. ACCA members resident in Australia and New Zealand will be invited to apply for CA membership and CA ANZ members will be invited to apply for ACCA membership, subject to meeting the eligibility criteria of the other body.

=== Bangladesh ===
The Institute of Chartered Accountants of Bangladesh (ICAB) is the national professional accounting body of Bangladesh. Established in 1973, it is the sole organization with the right to award the Chartered Accountant designation in Bangladesh. Senior members (at least five years' membership) of the institute are called "fellow members" and use the letters FCA.

Bangladesh has more than 1,900 registered Chartered Accountants and more than 32,000 articled students.

=== Bermuda ===
The Institute of Chartered Accountants of Bermuda works with the Canadian Institute of Chartered Accountants and American Institute of Certified Public Accountants, and is the sole organisation in Bermuda with the right to award the Chartered Accountant designation.

=== Canada ===
In Canada, chartered accountants belong to the Canadian Institute of Chartered Accountants (CICA) by way of membership in at least one provincial or territorial institute (or "order" in Quebec). In order to become a member, a candidate requires an undergraduate degree plus experience and, depending on the province, additional education. Candidates in all provinces are required to pass the three-day Uniform Evaluation (UFE) now Common Final Examination (CFE).

Since 2012, the CICA has been in a process of unification with the other two accounting bodies in Canada. Canadian CA's, along with Certified General Accountants (CGAs) and Certified Management Accountants (CMAs), have now adopted the designation Chartered Professional Accountant (CPA), making the term "chartered accountant" obsolete.

=== Czech Republic ===
In the Czech Republic, Chartered Accountants are generally members of Institute of Chartered Accountants of the Czech Republic and use the designatory letters CAE (Chartered Accountant expert). Chartered Accountants may also be members of the Chamber of Auditors of the Czech Republic (KACR), with whom the ICAEW launched its ACA qualification in 2015.

=== European Union ===
Under the Mutual Recognition Directive, European Economic Area (EEA) and Swiss nationals holding a professional qualification can become members of the equivalent bodies in another member state. They must, however, pass an aptitude test in understanding local conditions (which for accountants will include local tax and company law variations).

The local title is, however, not available for use if the professional does not choose to join the local professional body. For example, a holder of the French expert-comptable (in French) qualification could practise as an accountant in England without taking a local test but could only describe themself as "expert-comptable (France)" not "Chartered Accountant". Within the EEA, only the UK and Ireland have bodies that issue the Chartered Accountant title.

=== India ===
In India, Chartered Accountants are regulated by the Institute of Chartered Accountants of India (ICAI) which was established by the Chartered Accountants Act, 1949. Associate members of the ICAI are entitled to add the prefix CA to their names. Members who have been in continuous practice in India for at least 5 years or a member who has been an associate for a continuous period of not less than 5 years and who possesses experience equivalent to the experience normally acquired as a result of continuous practice for a period of 5 years as chartered accountant can use Fellow Chartered Accountant (FCA). As of 1 August 2024, the Institute had 414,758 active members.

Entry to the profession can be made by taking the CA Foundation Course after completion of schooling (12th grade). Alternatively, graduates may train as an articled assistant for two years in a chartered firm before final exam or after completion of Intermediate of Cost Accountant or Company Secretary. A comprehensive 100 hours of information technology training and an orientation programme for soft skills development have to be completed before being articled. However the CA certification is limited to the geographical boundary of India and is not valid in countries that follow different standards of accounting practice. After clearing of CA final examination, one may apply for membership to ICAI.

=== Indonesia ===
The Institute of Indonesia Chartered Accountants, formerly Indonesian Institute of Accountants or Ikatan Akuntan Indonesia is the national organisation of professional accountants in Indonesia. IAI is a founding member of the International Federation of Accountants (IFAC) and the ASEAN Federation of Accountants (AFA). In 2016 IAI became an Associate Member of Chartered Accountants Worldwide.

=== Ireland ===
In Ireland, Chartered Accountants are generally members of Chartered Accountants Ireland and use the designatory letters ACA or FCA. Chartered accountants may also be members of the Institute of Chartered Accountants in England and Wales or the Institute of Chartered Accountants of Scotland.

=== Nepal ===
In Nepal, the profession of Chartered Accountancy is regulated by the Institute of Chartered Accountants of Nepal (ICAN) which was established by parliament under the Chartered Accountants Act, 1997.

After completion of three levels of examination (CAP I, CAP II, and CAP III) with three years of articleship training under a qualified CA, one can get the membership of ICAN and with the Certificate of Practice (COP), one can practise as a professional accountant.

=== New Zealand ===
In New Zealand, Chartered Accountants belong to the Chartered Accountants Australia & New Zealand (CA ANZ, formerly New Zealand Institute of Chartered Accountants) and use the designatory letters CA. Some senior members may be elected fellows and use the letters FCA.

There is also a mid-tier qualification called Associate Chartered Accountant with the designatory letters ACA. Associate chartered accountants are not eligible to hold a certificate of public practice and therefore cannot offer services to the public.

=== Pakistan ===
The Institute of Chartered Accountants of Pakistan (ICAP) is the professional body of Chartered Accountants in Pakistan, established on 1 July 1961 under the Chartered Accountants Ordinance, 1961. ICAP is the sole body and authority in Pakistan which has a mandate to regulate the accounting and auditing profession in the country. It adopts and develops the national auditing standards and develops accounting standards for the Securities and Exchange Commission of Pakistan (SECP). It represents accountants employed in public practice, business and industry, and the public sector. The institute is a member of the International Federation of Accountants (IFAC), which is the global organization for the accountancy profession.

ICAP has more than 7,000 active members and more than 25,000 students. Other national accountancy bodies include Institute of cost and management accountants of Pakistan (ICMAP), PIPFA, etc. ICAP and ICMAP are full members of International federation of accountants and PIPFA is an associate member. Besides these national accountancy bodies, Association of Chartered Certified Accountants (ACCA) & Chartered Institute of Management Accountants (CIMA) UK Bodies also has a strong presence in Pakistan.

=== Singapore ===
The Chartered Accountant of Singapore (CA (Singapore)) title is protected under the Singapore Accountancy Commission (SAC) Act. The pathway to obtain the designation is owned by the SAC, a statutory body of the government. The Institute of Singapore Chartered Accountants (ISCA) is a designated entity in the SAC Act and confers the CA (Singapore) designation on behalf of SAC. The Singapore Chartered Accountant Qualification programme has three components: academic base, professional programme and 3 years of practical experience. ISCA and the SAC have worked to raise the profile and promote the Singapore CA Qualification for international recognition.

Applicants who are eligible for the Singapore Chartered Accountant Qualification foundation programme should have either accredited degrees, other degrees, undergraduates and local polytechnic diplomas. Those with who are eligible for direct entry into the professional programme should have local accountancy degrees from Nanyang Technological University, National University of Singapore, Singapore Management University, Singapore University of Social Sciences, and Singapore Institute of Technology.

In 2013, holders of Association of Chartered Certified Accountants (ACCA) and CPA Australia have until 31 December 2016 and existing students have until 31 December 2018 to complete the ICPAS PAC and qualify for the "Chartered Accountant of Singapore" professional designation through the previous transitional arrangements.

=== South Africa ===
In South Africa, SAICA, the South African Institute of Chartered Accountants, regulates the Chartered Accountant (South Africa) designation, CA (SA).

To qualify as a CA (SA), one requires a specialised bachelor's degree in accounting, followed by a Certificate in the Theory of Accounting (CTA); depending on the university, this is offered as a postgraduate honours degree or as a postgraduate diploma. This formal education is followed by two external competency exams set by SAICA.

A separate registration is needed for Chartered Accountants wishing to act as auditors in public practice as a registered auditor (RA). The RA designation is conferred by IRBA (Independent Regulatory Board For Auditors, previously known as Public Accountants and Auditors Board [PAAB]) under the Auditing Profession Act (AP Act).

Candidates must complete three years of practical experience, working for a registered training office – the Training In Public Practice (TIPP) programme. Articled clerks who switch employers during this period are required to extend their training by six months. The Training Outside Public Practice (TOPP) programme has a financial management focus; TOPP trainees can thus become Chartered Accountants with a more limited knowledge and experience of auditing than those who undergo the TIPP programme, but with a more extensive financial management and business experience.

Chartered accountants who are not registered auditors may not act as or hold out to be auditors in public practice. However, the AP Act does not prohibit non-RAs from using the description 'internal auditor' or 'accountant', or from auditing a not-for-profit club, institution or association if they receive no fee for such audit.

In South Africa the Companies Act was replaced, with effect in July 2010, to allow companies without a public interest to choose between an audit or an independent review. A review is not an attest function and can be performed by accountants who are members of bodies that are registered in terms of the Close Corporations Act of 1984, which include SAIBA, CIMA, SAICA, SAIPA and ACCA.

=== Sri Lanka ===
In Sri Lanka, the title of Chartered Accountant (CA Sri Lanka) can be used by only members of the Institute of Chartered Accountants of Sri Lanka. These could be Associate Members (ACA) and Fellows (FCA). Chartered accountants holding practising certificates may also become Registered Auditors, who are able to perform statutory financial audits in accordance with the Companies Act, No. 07 of 2007. Chartered Accountants can also register as company secretaries.

=== United Kingdom ===
The Institute of Chartered Accountants in England and Wales is an awarding body, conferring the postnominals ACA and FCA. The Institute of Chartered Accountants of Scotland confers the postnominals CA.

== List of institutes of chartered accountants ==
- Association of Chartered Certified Accountants (global)
- Bahamas Institute of Chartered Accountants
- Chartered Professional Accountants of Canada as a result of merger of Canadian Institute of Chartered Accountants (CICA), Society of Management Accountants of Canada (CMA Canada) and Certified General Accountants of Canada (CGA-Canada) in 2014
- Chartered Accountants Australia and New Zealand as a result of merger of New Zealand Institute of Chartered Accountants (NZICA) and the Institute of Chartered Accountants Australia (ICAA) in 2013
- Chartered Accountants Ireland (also covers Northern Ireland)
- Chartered Institute of Public Finance and Accountancy (CIPFA)
- European Institute of Chartered Accountants
- Institute of Chartered Accountants of Albania
- Institute of Chartered Accountants of Bangladesh
- Institute of Chartered Accountants of Barbados
- Institute of Chartered Accountants of Belize
- Institute of Chartered Accountants of Bermuda
- Institute of Chartered Accountants of the Eastern Caribbean
- Institute of Chartered Accountants in England & Wales
- Institute of Chartered Accountants of Ghana
- Institute of Chartered Accountants of Guyana
- Institute of Chartered Accountants of India
- Institute of Chartered Accountants of Indonesia
- Institute of Chartered Accountants of Jamaica
- Institute of Chartered Accountants in Malawi
- Institute of Chartered Accountants of Namibia
- Institute of Chartered Accountants of Nepal
- Institute of Chartered Accountants of Nigeria
- Institute of Chartered Accountants of Pakistan
- Institute of Chartered Accountants of Scotland
- Institute of Chartered Accountants of Sierra Leone
- Institute of Chartered Accountants of Sri Lanka
- Institute of Chartered Accountants of Trinidad and Tobago
- Institute of Chartered Accountants of Zimbabwe
- Institute of Singapore Chartered Accountants
- Royal Netherlands Institute of Chartered Accountants
- South African Institute of Chartered Accountants
