= Pan African Federation of Accountants =

- Formation: May 2011
- Type: Professional association
- Purpose: Development of the accountancy profession in Africa
- Headquarters: Johannesburg, South Africa
- Official language: English, French
- President; CEO: COSME GOUNDÉTÉ; ALTA PRINSLOO
- Affiliations: IFAC
- Website: http://www.pafa.org.za

The Pan African Federation of Accountants (PAFA) is the regional body that is aimed to represent African professional accountants with one and louder voice, particularly in relating with International Federation of Accountants (IFAC). It was inaugurated in Dakar, Senegal on 5 May 2011.

== Inauguration ==
The first president, elected at the inaugural meeting in Dakar, Senegal, was Major General Sebastian Achulike Owuama. Owuama is also president of the Institute of Chartered Accountants of Nigeria and of the Association of Accountancy Bodies in West Africa. Dr. Mussa J. Assad of the National Board of Accountants and Auditors in Tanzania was named vice president. The South African Institute of Chartered Accountants in Johannesburg hosts the PAFA Secretariat.

== Membership ==
At time of launch, members were:

- Benin
- Botswana – BICA
- Burkina Faso ONECCA-BF
- Burundi – OPC
- Cameroon
- Congo Brazzaville
- Democratic Republic of Congo – IDRC
- Ethiopia – EPAAA
- Gambia
- Ghana – ICAG
- Guinea Bissau
- Ivory Coast
- Kenya – ICPAK
- Lesotho – LIA
- Liberia
- Libya
- Malawi – SOCAM
- Mali
- Mauritius – MIPA
- Morocco
- Namibia – CFA, ICAN
- Niger
- Nigeria – ICAN
- Rwanda – ICPAR
- Senegal – ONECCA
- Sierra Leone
- South Africa – SAICA, SAIPA
- Sudan – SACA
- Swaziland – SIA
- Tanzania – NBAA
- Togo
- Tunisia
- Uganda – ICPA
- Zimbabwe – ICAZ, ICPAZ
