= ICAB =

ICAB may refer to:

- Igreja Católica Apostólica Brasileira (Brazilian Catholic Apostolic Church)
- Institute of Chartered Accountants of Bangladesh, a professional association
- Institute of Chartered Accountants of Barbados, a professional association
- Institute of Chartered Accountants of Belize, a professional association

iCab may refer to:

- iCab, a web browser for the Macintosh
