= ICAG =

ICAG may refer to:

- Institute of Chartered Accountants of Ghana, a professional association
- Institute of Chartered Accountants of Guyana, a professional association
- International Consolidated Airlines Group, S.A., an airline holding company
- Iron Chef Alex Guarnaschelli, who uses "ICAG" as a nickname
- International Charter Academy of Georgia
