= Shabbar Zaidi =

Pakistani chartered accountant

Syed Mohammad Shabbar Zaidi

26th Chairman of Federal Board of Revenue
- In office 9 May 2019 – 6 January 2020

Personal details
- Born: November 3, 1960 (age 65) Karachi, Pakistan
- Occupation: Accountant, former government minister, economic analyst and TV commentator

Syed Mohammad Shabbar Zaidi (Urdu: سیّد محمّد شبّر زیدی) is a Pakistani chartered accountant who served as the 26th Chairman of Federal Board of Revenue of Pakistan from May 2019 till April 2020.

== Early life and education ==
Zaidi was born in Karachi in 1960. After passing Intermediate and Matriculation exams with distinction from DJ Science College, Karachi, Mr. Zaidi opted for Chartered Accountancy and earned his degree with distinction from the Hailey College of Commerce, University of the Punjab, Lahore, in 1979. He is a fellow member of Institute of Chartered Accountants of Pakistan and also served as president of the Institute for 2005–2006.

== Career ==
Previously, Zaidi served as a provincial minister in the Government of Sindh during the 2013 caretaker setup. He was the territory partner of PwC Pakistan.

Zaidi had been working with A. F. Ferguson & Co., a member firm of PricewaterhouseCoopers International for more than 40 year and currently working as Senior Partner there. Since mid 2000s, he is notable for being one of the highest tax payers in Pakistan. Among his non-profit work, he is a trustee of Sindh Institute of Urology & Transplantation (SIUT) and member of Boards of Governors of Liaquat National Hospital and Karachi School of Business and Leadership (KSBL).

In the past, he has also been the President of the Institute of Chartered Accountants of Pakistan and Chairman of the South Asian Federation of Accountants. Syed Shabbar Zaidi has also authored several books, including Panama Leaks – A Blessing in Disguise – Offshore Assets of Pakistani Citizens, A Journey for Clarity and Pakistan: Not a Failed State. He is noteworthy for having the largest book collection in Pakistan. In 2018, he was the board of directors of Lucky Core Industries Limited.

Lately, Zaidi has been making TV appearances as an economic analyst on Dunya Kamran Khan Kay Sath TV show in Pakistan.

=== FBR Chairman ===
On 9 May 2019, then Prime Minister Imran Khan appointed Zaidi as a chairman of the Federal Board of Revenue. As FBR chairman he introduced the Asset Declaration Scheme, whose deadline was 3 July 2019. Advisor on Finance and Revenue Abdul Hafeez Shaikh said the scheme had led to a "whitening" of Rs 3 trillion assets and Rs 70 billion in revenue from 137,000 people. The amnesty scheme was supported by Imran Khan, who "made at least five dedicated addresses to the nation urging people to take benefit of the opportunity he offered." Prior to coming into government, Khan criticised tax amnesties, saying they were used to "fool the honest people of the country and encourage corrupt elements to plunder and amass wealth, only to whitewash it later on”.

He was removed from his post on 6 April 2020 and Nausheen Javed Amjad succeeded him as chairman FBR, Pakistan.

In a 2023 interview on Geo News' Aaj Shahzeb Khanzada Kay Sath program he alleged that "40 MNAs from the PTI, PPP and PML-N, led by the then foreign minister Shah Mahmood Qureshi, visited his office" and asked for him to withdraw a tax notice he issued on a landowner in Multan. Further claiming he was "advised" to stop attempts at bringing KPK's tobacco industry as "many of the tobacco barons were members of parliament belonging to the then ruling party." Zaidi also alleged that then Army Chief Qamar Javed Bajwa on call told him to lower Defence Housing Authority (DHA) real estate valuations after attempted tax increases. Former finance minister Asad Umar rejected Zaidi's claims of possible default in 2019, while Pakistan Tehreek-e-Insaaf (PTI) said "Shabar Zaidi’s contradictory and baseless claims are signs of a confused mind," on Twitter (X).

== Books ==
- A Journey for Clarity: An Analysis of Some Accounting Concepts in Taxation Matters (2014)
- Pakistan: (Not) A Failed State (2014)
- Rich People, Poor Country: a Story of Fiscal and Foreign Exchange Policies of Pakistan (2018). A book critical of a tax amnesty scheme in Pakistan.
- Al-Nafs Al-Mut̤maʼinnah, The Serene Self/The Journey for Righteous (2022). Co-written with his wife Begum Shakila Tahawur Zaidi. On the concept of Azadari, or lamentation, over the martyrdom of Husayn, third Imam of Shi'ah Islam, during the Battle of Karbala.
- Faith & Intellect: A Semi-Secular Discourse on Socio-Political Issues & Divine Revelations (2022)
- Foreign Exchange Regulations of Pakistan: Acquisition & Disposal of Shares & Securities (2023)
- 32 Onkar Road (2025). Autobiography, on his political, financial and religious experiences in Pakistan.
