= Ahsan Basir Sheikh =

Pakistani bureaucrat

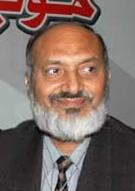
- Ahsan Basir Sheikh, in 2009
- Born: 9 May 1949 (age 77); Lahore, Pakistan
- Education: Punjab University, Lahore (M.Com); Institute of Cost and Management Accountants of Pakistan (FCMA); National Defence University, Pakistan (M.Sc (DSS)); Quaid-i-Azam University
- Occupations: Prorector, Bureaucrat, FCMA, Cost & Management Accountant

Ahsan Basir Sheikh (born 9 May in Lahore) is a retired Pakistani bureaucrat who currently serves as pro-rector (Administration & Finance) of Ghulam Ishaq Khan Institute of Engineering Sciences and Technology.

== Education ==
He did his Masters in Commerce (M.Com) with distinction, after getting B.Com (Honours) degree from Punjab University, Hailey College of Commerce, Lahore. He graduated from the prestigious National Defence University, Islamabad (N.D.Course) in the session 2003-04 leading to the master's degree in defence and strategic studies from Quaid-i-Azam University. Professionally, he is a qualified cost and management accountant from Institute of Cost and Management Accountants of Pakistan having been admitted as FCMA (Fellow Cost and Management Accountant) since 1975.

== Career ==
He is a retired BPS-21 officer who joined the Postal Group on the basis of Federal Competitive Examination Civil Service of Pakistan 1974 (2nd Common Batch). He has the 34 years experience of distinction of having worked on Command, Staff and Instructional appointments in the Pakistan Post, in addition to UN Consultant to several Foreign Postal Administrations in the field of Financial Management, Costing & Rate-Fixing and Commercial Accounting. His appointments include Post Master General (PMG), General Manager, PLI for Sindh & Balochistan, Director, Postal Staff College, Islamabad and Additional Director General of Pakistan Post. United Nations Consultants’ Missions were carried out with the governments of Malawi, Sri Lanka, Maldives, Solomon Islands, Tuvalu, Kiribati, Afghanistan and in the UPU Regional Advisor Office, Bangkok, Thailand.

== Other works ==
He also signed the agreement with Mobilink regarding mobile money order service in Pakistan when he was Additional Director General (Financial Services) in Pakistan Post and also designed operational and accounting systems for Special Mail and Financial Services for Pakistan Post e.g. EMS (Expedited Mail Services), Air Express, Urgent Mail Service, Postal Draft Service, GIRO etc. Savings Bank, Pension Disbursement, Collection of utility Bills, Disbursement of Financial Assistance to the poor under Benazir Income Support Programme (BISP) of the Federal Government and Food Support Programme of the Government of Punjab.

He also worked as Member/Advisor, Advocacy & Research (BPS-21), Competition Commission of Pakistan, Ministry of Finance, Government of Pakistan, Islamabad.

== Teaching ==
In 2013, Sheikh was serving as visiting faculty at the Secretariat Training Institute. From 2017 to 2018, he was Pro-Rector (Admin and Finance) at Ghulam Ishaq Khan Institute.

== Present assignment ==
Having worked on top level administration and finance positions, he is now the pro-rector (Administration & Finance) of Ghulam Ishaq Khan Institute of Engineering Sciences and Technology since August 2012.
