= Saipa =

Saipa may refer to:

== Organizations ==
- SAIPA, an Iranian automobile manufacturer
- Saipa Diesel, an Iranian manufacturer of trucks and trailers
- South African Institute of Professional Accountants, a professional association

== Sport ==
- Saipa F.C., an Iranian football team based in Karaj
- Saipa Shomal Sari F.C., an Iranian football team based in Q'aemshahr
- Saipa Cultural and Athletic Corporation, an Iranian multisport club based in Tehran and Karaj
  - Saipa Tehran VC, an Iranian volleyball club formerly known as Saipa Alborz VC
- SaiPa, a Finnish ice hockey team
