= PAFA =

PAFA may refer to:

- Peace Action is Freedom for All, a political party in Zimbabwe
- Pennsylvania Academy of the Fine Arts
- Perak Amateur Football Association, the former acronym of parent association of Perak football team in Malaysia before it turn professional
- Fairbanks International Airport (ICAO location indicator: PAFA), in Fairbanks, Alaska, United States
- Pan African Federation of Accountants, an umbrella body for Accountants in Africa
- Pakistan Air Force Academy Risalpur, Pakistan
