= Association of Accountancy Bodies in West Africa =

- Formation: 10 August 1982
- Type: Professional association
- Purpose: Encourage professionalism in accountancy in West Africa
- Headquarters: Abuja, Nigeria
- Official language: English
- Website: http://www.abwa-online.org/

The Association of Accountancy Bodies in West Africa (ABWA) is a regional organization of the International Federation of Accountants (IFAC). As of 2011 there were ten West African accounting institutes represented in ABWA.

== History ==
The association was established on 10 August 1982 in Lagos, Nigeria, and was registered as a corporation in 1994. ABWA was initially collocated with the Institute of Chartered Accountants of Nigeria (lCAN) in Lagos. In May 2002 the association's headquarters moved to the ICAN building in Abuja. The purpose of the Association is to develop accountancy in the region. Recognized non-governmental accountancy bodies in West African countries are encouraged to join the association.

== Activities ==
ABWA initiated the Accounting Technicians Scheme, West Africa, which provides a recognized professional qualification for supporting staff of Chartered Accountants. Examinations for this qualification are held on the same day each year in centers throughout the region. In May 2011 The Gambia Association of Accountancy ran a three-day "Train the trainer" seminar on International Financial Reporting Standards (IFRS) for Small and Medium Enterprises (SMEs) for trainers from The Gambia, Ghana, Sierra Leone, Liberia and Cameroon. The seminar was supported by the World Bank under the umbrella of ABWA.

In May 2011 Major General Sebastian Achulike Owuama (retired), the 46th President of ICAN and the 16th President of ABWA, was elected President of the newly created Pan-African Federation of Accountants (PAFA), or Fédération Panafricaine des Experts-Comptables (FEPEC). He was elected during the inaugural meeting of PAFA in Dakar, Senegal.

== Membership ==
As of 2011, ABWA had the following members:

Country	Acronym	Name
Benin	OECCA - BENIN	Ordre des Experts Comptables at Comptables Agréés du Benin
Burkina Faso		Ordre National des Experts Comptables et des Comptables Agrees du Burkina Faso
Cameroon	ONECCA	Ordre National des Experts Comptables du Cameroon Bilingual
Cote d’ Ivoire		Ordre des Experts Comptables et Comptables Agréés de Cote d'Ivoire
Gambia	GAA	The Gambia Association of Accountants
Ghana	ICAG	The Institute of Chartered Accountants (Ghana)
Guinea	OECAG	Ordre des Experts Comptables Agréés de Guinee
Liberia	LICPA	Liberian Institute of Certified Public Accountants
Mali	ONECAM	Ordre National des Experts Comptables et des Comptables Agréés du Mali
Niger	ONECCA-N	Ordre National des Experts Comptables et Comptables Agréés du Niger
Nigeria	ICAN	Institute of Chartered Accountants of Nigeria
Sierra Leone	ICASL	Institute of Chartered Accountants of Sierra Leone
Senegal	ONECCA	Ordre National des Experts Comptables et Comptables Agréés du Sénégal
Togo	ONECCA-TOGO	Association Togolaise des Experts Comptables Diplomas

As of March 2011, the Association of National Accountants of Nigeria (ANAN) had applied to become a member of ABWA.
