= University College of the Cayman Islands =

Tertiary education institution in the Cayman Islands

Coordinates: 19.279175°N 81.383833°W

- Former name: Community College of the Cayman Islands
- Motto: Study Local, Go Far.
- Type: Public University College
- Established: 1975
- Founder: The Cayman Islands Government
- Parent institution: Ministry of Education, Cayman Islands Government
- Accreditation: ASIC, IACBE (business programs)
- Affiliations: The Cayman Islands Government
- Religious affiliation: N/A
- Academic affiliations: Association of Caribbean Tertiary Institutions (ACTI), Association of Community Colleges (ACC)
- Budget: CI$9 million (2026 allocation for expansion)
- President: Nanalie Cover
- Vice-president: Dr. Livingston Smith
- Provost: Dr. Livingston Smith
- Academic staff: 70+ full-time
- Total staff: 51-200 (estimated)
- Students: approx. 2,000
- Undergraduates: approx. 1,800
- Postgraduates: approx. 200
- Doctoral students: 0 (no doctoral programs offered)
- Location: 168 Olympic Way, Grand Cayman KY1-1107, Cayman Islands, George Town, Cayman Islands
- Campus: Multiple sites
- Language: English
- Colors: Blue and Gold
- Mascot: Hornets
- Website: ucci.edu.ky

The University College of the Cayman Islands (UCCI) is a tertiary educational institution in the Cayman Islands.

== History ==
The original Community College was established as a part-time institution in 1975, and was the first government-sponsored tertiary education in the Cayman Islands.

The Trade School, the Hotel School and the Marine School were founded between 1976 and 1981.

In 1985 all of these institutions were amalgamated as the community College of the Cayman Islands.

In 2004 the Legislate Assembly passed an Act changing the name to the University College of the Cayman Islands.

As of 2026, the acting registrar is Dr. Patricia Robinson.

== Courses ==
The college offers certificate programmes in Accounting, Computer Technician, Electrical Technology, Computer Applications, Construction Technology and Hospitality Studies. UCCI works with the Cayman Islands Society of Professional Accountants (CISPA) in defining the college's accounting programme, and as of September 2007 to offer Certified Public Accountant (CPA), Certified General Accountant (CGA) and Association of Chartered Certified Accountants (ACCA) review classes. Reviewing the first year of UCCI's Certified Accounting Technician programme, CISPA considered that it had been successful, although some changes could be made to better prepare students for their first work experience.

The University College offers Associate of Arts, Associate of Sciences and Associate of Applied Sciences courses, followed by degree programmes leading to BSc degrees in Business Administration, Computer Science, Natural Science and Social Science, and Bachelor of Education degrees. UCCI also offers Commonwealth Executive MBA and Master of Public Administration degrees, as well as various professional and executive educational programmes.
