= Accounting in Bangladesh =

In Bangladesh, the profession of accountancy was developed during the British colonial period. The basic requirements for financial reporting by all companies in Bangladesh were provided by the Companies Act of 1994. Today, it is represented by two professional bodies, the Institute of Cost & Management Accountants of Bangladesh (ICMAB) and the Institute of Chartered Accountants of Bangladesh (ICAB).

Chartered Accountants completed their trainings by practicing in firms that specialize in financial accounting, financial audit and tax. CMAs receive particular training in cost audit, management audit, and management accounting, as well as general accounting and taxation. Both the ICMAB and ICAB are under the administrative control of the Ministry of Commerce. The Government of Bangladesh considers both types of professional accountants equal with respect to employment in government services as per circular No.Com/PTMA/AP/2/19/87.

The Generally Accepted Accounting Principles (GAAP) in Bangladesh are based upon standards set by the ICAB, which has stated its intention to adopt International Financial Reporting Standards. As of 2013, ICAB has adopted the IFRS as issued by the IASB, except for IAS 39, IAS 29, and IFRS 9 and All foreign companies, and domestic companies listed on the Dhaka Stock Exchange (DSE) and/or the Chittagong Stock Exchange (CSE) are required to use IFRS.

== Bangladesh Financial Reporting Standards (BFRS) ==
The Institute of Chartered Accountants of Bangladesh (ICAB) prescribes Financial Reporting Standards which are known as Bangladesh Financial Reporting Standards (BFRS). Bangladesh Accounting Standards (BAS) are also included in BFRS. International Accounting Standards and International Financial Reporting Standards which are issued by the International Accounting Standards Board are what the BFRS models on. For listed companies under the Securities and Exchange Commission (SEC) rules, adopted BFRS are legally enforceable.

== Accountants Profession of Bangladesh ==
The professional Cost and Management Accountants of Bangladesh's national body is the Institute of Cost and Management Accountants of Bangladesh (ICMAB). In order to promote and regulate the Cost and Management Accounting profession in the country, the ICMAB was established. To students interested in pursuing a career in this field, the institute offers training and education and highly recognized CMA degrees on fulfillment of their qualifications. The ICMAB is the sole authority to issue licences to their members for practice in the field.

They have many visions and missions. By promoting and regulating Cost and Management Accounting they want to improve the quality of life and economic competitiveness which will eventually lead to helping Bangladesh become and industrialized nation. The institute's mission is to provide better service to the society by having its members maintain the highest professional standard while developing, equipping, and promoting the Cost and Management Accounting profession. Implementation of National Accounting as well as Cost Accounting Standards are also used with other necessary steps in order to regulate the profession. The ultimate goal of this is to develop Bangladesh's natural and human resources to enrich the shared future of the country and to ensure common welfare.

The institute is governed by a council which is under the provision of the Cost and Management Accountants Ordinance of 1977. There are twelve members consisted in the council and they are elected by the members of ICMAB. The council also consists of four nominees from the Government of Bangladesh. Each term is for three years and every year there is one President, two Vice- Presidents, one Secretary, and one Treasurer elected from the councilors. A team of fully employed personnel, however, manages the day to day administrative affairs of the institute.

== Institute of Chartered Accountants of Bangladesh (ICAB) ==
The sole regulator of accountants and auditors in Bangladesh under the Bangladesh Chartered Accountants Order of 1973 was the Institute of Charted Accountants (ICAB). There are many mandatory requirements included in the ICAB:

1. Determining if you are qualified for membership in the institute
2. Being able to see the initial and continuing professional development of its members
3. Having professional examinations conducted
4. Establishing and maintaining a quality assurance review system
5. Being able to license auditors
6. Maintaining and publishing of its members qualified to practice as accountants and auditors
7. Investigating and disciplining its members for misconduct professionally
8. Allowing them to set accounting and auditing standards

Membership in the ICAB is mandatory for all Chartered Accountants whether financial accountant or financial auditor. Fellow Chartered Accountants or Associate Chartered Accountants are usually what members of the ICAB are designated as.

== See also ==
- Sections on British rule in History of Bangladesh and History of Bengal
