= Accounting in Portugal =

There are two professional associations responsible for regulation of accountancy in Portugal.

== Ordem dos Contabilistas Certificados ==
Ordem dos Contabilistas Certificados (OCC) runs an admittance examination every four months and everyone that passes it becomes a Contabilista Certificado (CC), the authorized tax and accountancy practitioner in Portugal.

OCC, which is the largest Portuguese professional body, with more than 75,000 affiliates, offers a broad range of training programs to its members, and is an active member in the public discussion of accounting and finance issues.

== Ordem dos Revisores Oficiais de Contas ==
Ordem dos Revisores Oficiais de Contas (OROC) confers the national qualification for auditors (ROC).

OROC is the national member of International Federation of Accountants (IFAC).
