= National Audit Office (Tanzania) =

Tanzanian parliamentary body

Independent Parliamentary body overview
- Formed: 2001
- Preceding Independent Parliamentary body: Exchequer and Audit Department
- Jurisdiction: Government of Tanzania
- Headquarters: 4 Ukaguzi Road; Dodoma, Tanzania
- Independent Parliamentary body executive: Charles Kichere, Auditor General of Tanzania
- Website: nao.go.tz

The National Audit Office (NAO) of Tanzania is an independent Parliamentary body in Tanzania which is responsible for auditing central government departments, government agencies and non-departmental public bodies. The NAO also carries out value for money (VFM) audits into the administration of public policy. The office is headed by the Chief Auditor General appointed by the President of Tanzania.

== History ==
Following the transfer of the mandate of Tanganyika Territory from Germany to Great Britain after the Treaty of Versailles, the Overseas Audit Services handled all the auditing responsibilities of the colonial government. On 1 July 1961, the Exchequer and Audit Ordinance of 1961 came into effect in Tanganyika. This law changed the name of the Audit Department to the Exchequer and Audit Department and changed the name of the head of the Audit Department to become the Controller and Auditor General (CAG).

Following Independence the mandate of the CAG continued under the same ordinance and continued under the interim constitution in 1962 and the new constitution in 1977. With the increased privatization drive by the government, in 2001 the Exchequer and Audit Ordinance, 1961 was repealed and replaced by the Public Finance Act, No. 6 of 2001. The finance act was revised in 2008, and is the current mandate that provides the NAOT and the CAG its mandate, powers and independence.

== List of auditors generals of Tanzania ==
The following is a list of auditor generals of Tanzania since independence in 1961.

#	Auditor General	Took office	Left office	Head of state
1	R.W.A. McColl	1961	1963	Julius Nyerere
2	Gordon. A. Hutchinson	1964	1969	Julius Nyerere
3	Mohamed Aboud	1969	1985	Julius Nyerere
3	Mohamed Aboud	1985	1995	Ali Hassan Mwinyi
4	Thomas Kiama	1996	2005	Benjamin Mkapa
5	Ludovick S. L. Utouh	2006	2014	Jakaya Kikwete
6	Mussa Juma Assad	2 December 2014	2019	John Magufuli
7	Charles E. Kichere	2019	Incumbent	John Magufuli
7	Charles E. Kichere	2019	Incumbent	Samia Suluhu

== See also ==
- National Board of Accountants and Auditors
