= Institute of Chartered Accountants of the Caribbean =

Caribbean association

- Abbreviation: ICAC
- Formation: October 28, 1988; 38 years ago
- Legal status: Corporation
- Headquarters: Kingston, Jamaica
- Region served: Caribbean
- Official language: English
- President: Khalil Alli
- Chief Executive Officer (CEO): Misha Lobban
- Website: www.icac.org.jm

The Institute of Chartered Accountants of the Caribbean (ICAC) is an association of accounting organizations in the Caribbean region that promotes professionalism and standards of best practice in the region.

== Purpose ==
The ICAC was incorporated as a company on October 28, 1988 under the laws of Jamaica. Its aims are to promote international standards for best accountancy practices, to build a strong and cohesive accountancy profession, and to encourage the exchange of ideas and information between accountants who belong to the member bodies. The ICAC supports self-regulation based on a regional monitoring program, and encourages standardization of qualifications and professional conduct rules. The institute seeks to give leadership on issues that affect the accounting profession in the region.

== Activities ==
Following the meltdown of Enron at the end of 2001, ICAC came under increasing pressure to improve oversight of the accounting industry. In July 2003, ICAC was planning to introduce a regional practice-monitoring system to enhance the regulatory capacity of the profession. After several corporate failures during the Great Recession, ICAC announced a scheme in November 2008 under which all members of the accounting Institutes in Barbados, Guyana and Trinidad and Tobago who performed audits would receive at least one monitoring visit during the six-year period starting in 2009. As of 2009, all Caribbean islands that are part of ICAC had to undergo peer review except Jamaica, which was regulated by a public accountant oversight board. ICAC's emphasis on self-regulation and peer review has been criticized, since it is difficult to guarantee independence with the small numbers of professional accountants in each member state.

In 2006, ICAC was helping its member institutes to prepare for the Caribbean Single Market (CSM). The ICAC 2011 annual meeting, held in the Jamaica Pegasus Hotel in Kingston on 23–25 June 2011, attracted about 1,000 accountants from across the region.

== Membership ==
Members are

- Bahamas Institute of Chartered Accountants,
- Institute of Chartered Accountants of Barbados,
- Institute of Chartered Accountants of Belize,
- Institute of Chartered Accountants of the Eastern Caribbean,
- Institute of Chartered Accountants of Guyana,
- Institute of Chartered Accountants of Jamaica,
- Institute of Chartered Accountants of Trinidad and Tobago and
- Suriname Chartered Accountants Institute.

Associate member

- Turks and Caicos Islands Society of Professional Accountants (TCISPA),

Affiliates are

- American Institute of Certified Public Accountants,
- Chartered Professional Accountants of Canada (CPA-Canada),
- Association of Chartered Certified Accountants (ACCA),
- Chartered Institute of Public Finance and Accounting (CIPFA).

As of 2008, ICAC was continuing membership discussions with the Cayman Islands Society of Professional Accountants from the previous year, and was also discussing membership with the recently formed British Virgin Islands Association of Professional Accountants (BVIAPA) and Suriname Association of Accountants (SUVA). The Suriname Association of Accountants was an associate of ICAC in 2011.
