= Accounting Standards Board (Canada) =

Standard Board

The Accounting Standards Board (AcSB) establishes accounting standards for use by private enterprises and private sector not-for-profit organisations in Canada. The AcSB contributes to the development of International Financial Reporting Standards (IFRSs) by participating in consultations and activities of the International Accounting Standards Board (IASB) to ensure Canadian publicly accountable entities' financial reporting needs are adequately considered. The AcSB develops and participates in the development of financial reporting standards.

As an independent body, the AcSB is intended to increase client confidence and promote objectivity, assisting organizations to make informed decisions on where best to allocate their financial assets.

== Responsibilities ==
According to their Terms of Reference, their responsibilities include:

- The creation of financial accounting standards following review,
- Implementing effective working standards for themselves,
- Researching financial reporting standards in order to refine theirs,
- Communication with stakeholders,
- Being accountable to the oversight council,
- Advising the oversight council as to what budget and amount of human resources and are needed to accomplish their goals.

== Stakeholders ==
The AcSB's stakeholders include preparers, auditors, advisors and financial statement users in the following sectors:

- Private enterprises.
- Not-for-profit organizations (NFPOs).
- Public Companies

== Members ==
Ten voting and three non-voting members make up the AcSB, including a paid Chair. View current AcSB members.

The AcSB membership consists of a diverse group of members with a range of experience from various locations across Canada.

The Board's support staff comprises:

- A Director
- 11 principals
- Two administrative assistants.

The Board is may also periodically hire consultants when the need arises.

== Setting standards ==
Generally accepted accounting principles (GAAP) are intended to apply to general purposes financial statements that meet common information needs for a range of users, but there are limits to how much latitude GAAP can provide for diversity in practice. As a result, in 2005, the AcSB developed a strategy whereby separate accounting frameworks were adopted for publicly accountable enterprises, private enterprises and private sector not-for-profit organizations as "one size does not fit all."

=== International Financial Reporting Standards (IFRSs) ===
For issues related to publicly accountable enterprises, agenda topics come from the following sources:

- The AcSB adds a topic to its agenda when the IASB activates a project. Work proceeds in parallel with the IASB. The AcSB contributes to the development of IFRSs by participating in consultations and activities of the IASB, as well as providing research for the IASB on certain projects.
- The IFRS Discussion Group, a regular public forum to discuss issues that arise in Canada when applying IFRSs. The Group assists the AcSB in identifying and analyzing these issues so that the Board can raise them with the IASB and IFRS Interpretations Committee.

=== Standards for private enterprises, not-for-profit organizations and pension plans ===
Accounting standards for private enterprise (ASPE) issues come from many sources, including the following:

- The Private Enterprise Advisory Committee, which makes recommendations to the AcSB on potential changes to accounting standards for private enterprises. The AcSB staff also notifies the Committee of relevant developments in other jurisdictions.
- Committees, the AcSB or members of the public may raise issues, including issues regarding the application of ASPE.

At the AcSB's request, the Committee also reviews each new IFRS and standards developed by other Boards, including the U.S. FASB, and considers whether to recommend that some or all provisions of a standard be included in ASPE.

Not-for-profit organization issues also come from many sources, including:

- proposed changes to accounting standards for private enterprises that also apply to not-for-profit organizations;
- the AcSB/PSAB Joint Not-for-Profit Task Force and its members;
- AcSB members; and
- members of the public.

For matters related to pension plans, AcSB members or members of the public may raise these.

== Relationship with CPA Canada ==
CPA Canada is the national organization representing the Chartered Professional Accountant (CPA) profession in Canada. CPA Canada provides funding, staff and other resources to support an independent standard-setting process.

CPA Canada and the boards and oversight councils function at arm's length from one another. As a result, the boards and oversight councils as well as their staff carry out their standard-setting operations in an independent manner.

== Accounting Standards Oversight Council (AcSOC) ==
The Accounting Standards Oversight Council (AcSOC) is an independent, volunteer body established by the Canadian Institute of Chartered Accountants (CICA) (Note: The CICA and CMA Canada joined together on January 1, 2013, to create CPA Canada as the national organization to support unification of the Canadian accounting profession under the CPA banner) in 2000 to serve the public interest by overseeing and providing input into the activities of the Accounting Standards Board (AcSB). In 2003, AcSOC started overseeing and providing input into the activities of the Public Sector Accounting Board (PSAB). It oversees the activities of the AcSB and the Public Sector Accounting Board. The Council ensures the Boards follow its rigorous due process. AcSOC also appoints Board members and provides input on strategy and priorities. AcSOC also assesses and reports to the public on the performance of the Boards.

AcSOC serves the public interest by playing a key role in Canadian financial reporting by overseeing and evaluating the performance of, and providing input into, the activities of Canada's accounting standard-setting boards – the AcSB and PSAB.

=== Responsibilities ===
See AcSOC's Terms of Reference.

=== Membership ===
AcSOC comprises between 20 and 25 voting members, including five non-voting members. View current AcSOC members.

The AcSOC membership consists of senior members from, amongst others, the following:

- Business
- Finance
- Government
- Academia
- Accounting and legal professions
- Regulators
- Private sector not-for-profits
- Financial analyst communities.

Members have a broad perspective of the complex issues facing standard setters.

=== Meetings ===
AcSOC normally meets three times a year. To better serve the Council's objectives, additional meetings and conference calls may take place.

Except for administrative matters, meetings are generally open to public observation.

== AcSOC's Relationship with CPA Canada ==
CPA Canada is the national organization representing the Chartered Professional Accountant (CPA) profession in Canada. CPA Canada provides funding, staff and other resources to support an independent standard-setting process.

CPA Canada and the boards and oversight councils function at arm's length from one another. As a result, the boards and oversight councils as well as their staff carry out their standard-setting operations in an independent manner.

== See also ==
- List of accountancy bodies
- Accounting Standards Review Board (New Zealand)
- Accounting Standards Board (United Kingdom)
- Accounting Standards (India)
