= Iranian Institute of Certified Accountants =

Accounting organization of Iran

- انجمن حسابداران خبره ایران
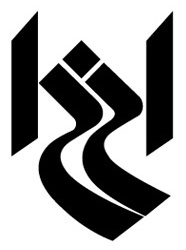
- Abbreviation: IICA
- Formation: 21 February 1973; 53 years ago
- Legal status: non-governmental association
- Headquarters: Tehran, Iran
- Region served: Iran
- Official language: Persian
- President: Houshang Khastoui
- General Secretary: Mohsen Ghasemi
- Website: www.iranianica.com www.iica.ir

Iranian Institute of Certified Accountants (IICA) is a national professional accounting body of Iran. It was established at 21 February 1973 as a non-governmental association in Iran. IICA is the largest professional accounting body in Iran in terms of membership (more than 6000 members; CAs & ICAs). Associate members of IICA are known as Certified Accountant (CA), and, fellow members of IICA are known as Independent Certified Accountant (ICA). IICA is the first Iranian member of the International Federation of Accountants (IFAC) (since 1998).

== Members ==
Each accountancy professional can become a member of IICA by taking prescribed examinations, undergoing five years of practical training, and meeting other requirements under the IICA's Statute.

== Council ==
Governing body of the IICA is a council constituted under the IICA's Statute, 1991. The Council consists of 9 elected members. The elected members of the council are elected under the single non-transferable vote system by the members of the institute. Every year, three members of the council is elected. The Council elects four of its members to be president, vice-president, treasurer, and council secretary who hold office for one year. Houshang Khastoui (CPA, ICA) is the President of the IICA, now (since 27 Jan 2015).

== General Secretary ==
The General Secretary, who is the chief executive officer of the IICA, is appointed by the IICA's president, for non-limited period. Managing of the IICA's office is undertaken by the General Secretary. Mohsen Ghasemi (ICA) is the General Secretary of the IICA, now (since 15 Jan 2014).

President & General Secretary of IICA (2015)
Mohsen Ghasemi (ICA), General Secretary of IICA

== See also ==
- Economy of Iran
- Taxation in Iran
- IFAC Member Bodies and Associates
