= Cayman Islands Society of Professional Accountants =

Organisation in the Cayman Islands

- Abbreviation: CISPA
- Formation: 1970
- Headquarters: Cayman Islands
- Region served: Cayman Islands
- Official language: English
- President: Baron Jacob
- Website: www.cispa.ky

The Cayman Islands Society of Professional Accountants (CISPA) is a professional association of accountants in the Cayman Islands, a British Overseas Territory in the Caribbean. CISPA is responsible for licensing accounting practitioners, supports education of accountants and participates in decisions about the financial industry in the offshore financial centre.

== Authority ==
CISPA was founded as a professional association in 1970. By 2007 the society had grown to 1000 members. The passage of the Public Accountants Law and its associated regulations in 2007 gave increased regulatory responsibilities to CISPA. Under the new law, CISPA became responsible for regulating the profession in the Caymans, including members and other accountants. CISPA has been an associate of the International Federation of Accountants (IFAC) since 2008. As of 2008 the Institute of Chartered Accountants of the Caribbean (ICAC) was continuing membership discussions with CISPA from the previous year.

== Education ==
CISPA works with the University College of the Cayman Islands (UCCI) in defining the college's accounting program, and as of September 2007 to offer Certified Public Accountant (CPA), Certified General Accountant (CGA) and Association of Chartered Certified Accountants (ACCA) review classes. Reviewing the first year of UCCI's Certified Accounting Technician program, CISPA considered that it had been successful, although some changes could be made to better prepare students for their first work experience.

== Financial industry participation ==
Accounting is an essential activity in the Cayman Islands: in 2006 it was estimated the banking sector contributes about 25 percent of the Cayman Islands GDP. CISPA is a member of the Cayman Islands Financial Services Association (CIFSA), formed in November 2003. In 2005 the Cayman Islands Monetary Authority (CIMA) requested that a working group be formed to review the recommendations of CIMA's Policy and Research Division, which had been examining regulation of the mutual funds industry. CISPA was invited to participate, as were the Cayman Islands Fund Administrators Association, the Cayman Islands Law Society and the Cayman Islands Bar Association.
