= Institute of Chartered Accountants of the Eastern Caribbean =

Professional accountancy body

- mirchi
- Abbreviation: ICAEC
- Formation: June 17, 2004; 21 years ago
- Headquarters: Saint Kitts and Nevis; Saint Lucia; Antigua and Barbuda
- Region served: Caribbean
- Official language: English
- Website: www.icaecab.org Antigua Branch www.sknaccountants.com/about.asp St. Kitts & Nevis Branch

The Institute of Chartered Accountants of the Eastern Caribbean (ICAEC) is a professional accountancy body formed on June 17, 2004 representing accountants in the Eastern Caribbean, including Grenada, St Kitts & Nevis, St Lucia and Antigua & Barbuda. It holds an annual conference.

Members of the accountancy bodies which had previously been active in the region (the Institute of Chartered Accountants of Antigua and Barbuda, the St Kitts-Nevis Association of Chartered Accountants and the Institute of Chartered Accountants of St Lucia) became the founder members of the ICAEC which established 3 branches in St Kitts & Nevis, St Lucia and Antigua & Barbuda.

ICAEC is a member of the Institute of Chartered Accountants of the Caribbean.
