= National Board of Accountants and Auditors =

- Formation: 15 January 1973
- Type: Regulatory body
- Purpose: Certify accountants
- Headquarters: Dar es Salaam
- Region served: Tanzania
- Official language: English
- Website: http://www.nbaa.go.tz

The National Board of Accountants and Auditors (NBAA) is an accounting professional and regulatory body operating under the Ministry of Finance and Economic Affairs, the sole body to certify accountants in Tanzania. It began operating on 15 January 1973.

== Accounting standards ==
All non-government business entities in Tanzania have been required to use International Financial Reporting Standards (IFRS) since 2004, while until May 2010 government business entities were required to use International Public Sector Accounting Standards. As of May 2010, the NBAA clarified that some government-owned entities was now required to use full IFRS and others were allowed to use IFRS for SMEs. When using the IFRS standards, the entities had to use them in full and without modification from the form issued by the International Accounting Standards Board (IASB).

== Professional qualifications ==
The NBAA is an examining body for professional accountancy qualifications, but does not train candidates seeking to qualify as accountants. Instead, it works with various public and private training institutions.

The NBAA serves both the public and the private sectors, although there have been weaknesses in its support for public financial managers. To address this, the NBAA worked with the Eastern and Southern Africa Association of Accountants General, the Federation of Accountants and Auditors General of West Africa and the English Speaking African Association of Supreme Audit Institutions to develop a PFM Qualifications Framework for Tanzania, which would be used as a pilot for the region. After evaluating and rejecting several options, the NBAA appeared to be leaning towards a mixed public/private sector curriculum for all candidates. However, there has been resistance to implementing this compromise.

== Associated bodies ==
The NBAA is a member body of the International Federation of Accountants (IFAC). It was a charter member of the Pan African Federation of Accountants (PAFA). Dr. Mussa J. Assad of the NBAA was named vice president of PAFA at its inaugural meeting on 5 May 2011.

== See also ==
- National Audit Office (Tanzania)
