= Institute of Chartered Accountants of Jamaica =

Jamaican professional accountancy body

- Abbreviation: ICAJ
- Formation: 1965
- Headquarters: Kingston, Jamaica
- Region served: Jamaica
- Official language: English
- President: Allison Peart
- Website: icaj.org

The Institute of Chartered Accountants of Jamaica (ICAJ) is a professional accountancy body in Jamaica. It is the sole organisation in Jamaica with the right to award the Chartered Accountant designation.

== History ==
ICAJ was established in 1965, three years after Jamaica gained its independence. The 1968 Public Accountancy Act was the statute for the incorporation of the ICAJ. In July 1980 the institute bought its property at 8 Ruthven Road, Kingston for the ICAJ headquarters. The ICAJ Secretariat facilities were formally opened on 18 January 1995. The ICAJ Code of Ethics was approved by Council in July 2000. ICAJ was designated the sole official agent of the Public Accountancy Board by the Ministry of Finance on 7 March 2001.

In the early 2000s there were well-publicized failures of companies such as Enron and Worldcom in the United States, and Parmalat in Europe. ICAJ came under pressure to ensure that Jamaican companies could not have similar problems, which should have been caught by auditors. In October 2002 ICAJ announced that it was embarking on a financial system improvement project that would strengthen the enforcement and compliance framework of the accountancy profession in Jamaica and ensure that investors received accurate information.

In November 2004 there was a proposal to make changes to the Money Laundering Act. According to the opposition, these would give the minister of finance the right to "violate the secrecy laws without any reference to the courts which is the only saving grace between individuals, companies and the overwhelming power of the state". ICAJ president Linroy Marshall said his organization had not been consulted on the proposal, but expressed serious concern about any move to violate confidentiality between an accountant and their client.

In June 2003, and again in June 2011, ICAJ hosted the ICAC annual meeting. Attendance grew from 300 in 2003 to over 900 in 2011.

== Standards ==
On 1 July 2002 ICAJ adopted International Accounting Standards (IAS) and International Financial Reporting Standards (IFRS) as Jamaica's national accounting and auditing standards. The Inter-American Development Bank (IDB) provided funding for a three-year program to implement and ensure compliance with these standards. The move brought Jamaica in line with European standards, but at first meant that companies filing their financial reports with the U.S. Securities and Exchange Commission (SEC) would have to reconcile their figures to Generally Accepted Accounting Practices (GAAP) and highlight the differences from IFRS. In June 2007 the SEC allowed companies to file using IFRS, removing the burden of reconciliation.

== Agreements with other organizations ==
A long-standing agreement with the Association of Chartered Certified Accountants (ACCA) allows ICAJ to administer local examinations for the ACCA qualifications. In October 2001 ICAJ signed an agreement with the Association of Accounting Technicians (AAT) for ICAJ to provide services to AAT students locally. In January 2005, ICAJ and the University of the West Indies (Mona Campus) signed an agreement to review and monitor the university's MSc Accounting program to ensure it meets international standards.

In June 2006, ICAJ signed an agreement with Certified General Accountants of Canada to recognize the CGA designation as an entry qualification for accounting students. This was in line with ICAJ's goal for accountants to be mobile within the region and for Jamaica to stay competitive within the Caribbean Single Market. The CARICOM Single Market and Economy agreement would allow Jamaicans to work in other member states, but not to transfer their pensions. The ICAJ was involved in discussions on how to make pensions portable. ICAJ is a member of the International Federation of Accountants (IFAC). ICAJ is also a member of the Institute of Chartered Accountants of the Caribbean (ICAC).
