= Institute of Chartered Accountants of Pakistan =

Pakistani professional accountancy organization

- ادارہَ محاسبانِ منشوری، پاکستان
- Emblem of ICAP
- Abbreviation: ICAP
- Predecessor: Ministry of Commerce
- Formation: July 1, 1961; 65 years ago
- Legal status: Body corporate established under The Chartered Accountants Ordinance, 1961 promulgated by the President of Pakistan
- Purpose: Accounting and Auditing Regulatory Body
- Headquarters: Chartered Accountants Avenue, Block 8, Clifton, Karachi, 75600
- Coordinates: 24°59′03.0″N 67°02′07.6″E
- Region served: Pakistan
- Members: 10,096 (2024)
- Official language: English, Urdu
- President: Muhammad Samiullah Siddiqui, FCA
- Vice President: Ahmed Raza, FCA
- Vice President: Jehan Zeb Amin, FCA
- Website: www.icap.org.pk

The Institute of Chartered Accountants of Pakistan (ICAP) is the premier regulatory and professional body for accountants in Pakistan. It was established on 1 July 1961 as a statutory body under the Chartered Accountants Ordinance, 1961 promulgated by the President of Pakistan to oversee the regulation of accountants and development of the profession of Chartered Accountancy in Pakistan.

== History ==
=== Origins of the Accountancy Profession (Pre-1932) ===
The roots of the practice of accountancy in Pakistan lie in the era of colonialism in Britain. At that time, audits were made according to the provisions of the Companies Act 1850, and companies usually had both European and Indian auditors who represented different shareholders' parties.

The Companies Act 1885 introduced provisions relating to appointment, pay, and functions of auditors. It is worth mentioning that the auditors did not have to be professionally qualified accountants, and people from other professions could act as auditors.

An important point was the adoption of the Indian Companies Act, 1913, when it became obligatory for the auditor of a public limited company to have an Auditor's Certificate issued by the government. The provinces had powers to issue Auditor's Certificates, and the central government had the right to recognize as auditors members of particular professional organizations of accountants.

=== Professional Regulation and Institutional Development (1932–1947) ===
The implementation of the Auditors' Certificates Rules, 1932 constituted a major milestone in the regulation of the accountancy profession. The rules brought about an organized system for qualification, examination, training, and registration of auditors. In this era, the profession was regulated by the Ministry of Commerce of the Central Government, while the Indian Accountancy Board was an advisory body in regard to issues concerning accountancy and auditing. This helped to create a professional and organized accountancy profession before the formation of Pakistan in 1947.

=== Development of the Profession in Pakistan (Post-1947) ===
Since its emergence as an independent state in 1947, Pakistan had inherited a small accountancy profession where the regulatory body of the profession, the Federal Ministry of Commerce, had inherited only 106 qualified accountants. However, the regulatory control continued through the Auditors' Certificates Rules, 1950, which were based on the pre-partition model.

The year 1952 marked the formation of Pakistan Institute of Accountants by the "Registered Accountants" to promote the interest of their profession. Later, in 1959, the establishment of the Department of Accountancy at the Ministry of Commerce provided further regulation to the profession and the Council of Accountancy suggested that there should be an autonomous professional body of the accountants in Pakistan.

The culmination of all this resulted in the promulgation of the Chartered Accountants Ordinance, 1961, by the President of Pakistan, Field Marshal Muhammad Ayub Khan, and the founding of the Institute of Chartered Accountants of Pakistan (ICAP) on 1 July 1961.

The profession experienced additional development through the enactment of the Companies Ordinance, 1984, which superseded the Companies Act, 1913. The Ordinance increased the scope of work for the professional accountants by increasing the need for financial reporting and cost accounting and audit systems. This improved the regulatory system of corporate financial reports and audits and strengthened the role of the ICAP in ensuring professionalism in the field of accounting in Pakistan.

== Objectives ==
ICAP regulates the profession of chartered accountancy in Pakistan; it lays down qualification requirements, conducts examinations, awards memberships and sets standards for accounting, auditing, and ethics for its members.

Moreover, it also looks after the Continuous Professional Development (CPD) of its members and is involved in policy making in regard to various aspects of accounting, business, economy, taxation, corporate governance, and sustainable development. In addition, it gives advice to the government on financial, taxation, and corporate matters and collaborates with regulatory authorities and business community to enhance quality of corporate reporting and governance.

== Structure and governance ==
ICAP is governed by a council, which comprises elected members from the profession and government-nominated representatives. The Council is responsible for formulating policies, overseeing the administration of the institute, and upholding the integrity and standards of the profession. The President of ICAP is elected by the Council members, typically for a term of one year.

The operational activities are managed by the Secretary/Chief Operating Officer and various departments, which oversee areas such as education, examinations, member affairs, technical standards, and legal compliance.

== Education and qualification pathway ==
To become a chartered accountant in Pakistan, students must register with ICAP and complete a rigorous program that includes:

1. Entry Routes: Students can enter through the Foundation Route (after Intermediate/A-levels) or Graduate/Master’s Route (after a university degree).
2. Examinations: The ICAP qualification comprises four stages – Pre Requisite Competencies (PRC), Certificate in Accounting and Finance (CAF), Certified Finance and Accounting Professional (CFAP), and Multi-subject Assessment (MSA).
3. Training: Practical training with an ICAP-approved accounting firm or organization is mandatory and spans a period of 3.5 to 4 years.
4. Ethics and CPD: Students must complete ethics modules and, after qualification, continue professional development throughout their careers.

== Membership and recognition ==
ICAP members are entitled to use the designation ACA (Associate Chartered Accountant) and, after fulfilling experience requirements, FCA (Fellow Chartered Accountant). As of 2023, ICAP has over 9,106 members working in Pakistan and across the globe in leadership roles in corporate entities, regulatory bodies, government departments, and multilateral organizations.

ICAP’s qualification is internationally recognized, and its members often work in countries like the United Arab Emirates, Saudi Arabia, the United Kingdom, Canada, and Australia, among others.

== International affiliations ==
ICAP is an active member of various prestigious international and regional organizations, including:

- International Federation of Accountants (IFAC)
- South Asian Federation of Accountants (SAFA)
- Confederation of Asian and Pacific Accountants (CAPA)
- International Accounting Standards Board (IASB) (through participation in standard-setting processes)

These affiliations allow ICAP to contribute to and stay aligned with global accounting and auditing standards.

== Presidents ==
The following is a list of presidents of the institute:

Year	Name	Organization
1961–1962	Syed Osman Ali	First Accountant of Pakistan
1962–1963	M. Ahmad	Ministry of Finance (Pakistan)
1963–1966	M. Aslam	Ministry of Finance (Pakistan)
1966–1969	Vaqar Ahmed	Ministry of Finance (Pakistan)
1969–1970	A. Rab	Ministry of Finance (Pakistan)
1970–1972	Vasim Aon Jafarey	Ministry of Finance (Pakistan)
1972–1973	M. Yakub	Ministry of Finance (Pakistan)
1973–1975	Ejaz Ahmed Naik	Ministry of Finance (Pakistan)
1975–1978	Abdur Raouf Shaikh	Ministry of Finance (Pakistan)
1979	Aftab Ahmed Khan	Ministry of Finance (Pakistan)
1979–1983	H. U. Beg	Ministry of Finance (Pakistan)
1983–1986	Irtiza Husain	PricewaterhouseCoopers Pakistan
1986–1988	Ebrahim Dahodwala	BDO International Pakistan
1988–1989	M. Afzal Munif	BKR International Pakistan
1989–1991	Ebrahim Sidat	Ernst & Young Pakistan
1991–1992	Abdul Hameed Chaudhri	Hameed Chaudhri & Company
1992–1993	Khalid Rafi	PricewaterhouseCoopers Pakistan
1993–1994	Muhammad Yousuf Adil	Deloitte Pakistan
1994–1996	Syed Masoud Ali Naqvi	KPMG Pakistan
1996–1997	Sajjad Ahmad	PricewaterhouseCoopers Pakistan
1997–1998	Ahmad Dawood Patel	Ernst & Young Pakistan
1998–1999	Najam I. Chaudhri	PricewaterhouseCoopers Pakistan
1999–2000	Shaukat Amin Shah	M/s Amin & Co., Chartered Accountants
2000–2001	Pir Mohammad A. Kaliya	First Paramount Modaraba
2001–2002	A. Husain A. Basrai	KPMG Pakistan
2002–2003	Khaliq-ur-Rahman	Grant Thornton Pakistan
2003–2004	Mujahid Eshai	Chartac Business Services (Pvt.) Ltd.
2004–2005	Zafar Iqbal Sobani	Hub Power Company
2005–2006	Syed Mohammad Shabbar Zaidi	PricewaterhouseCoopers Pakistan
2006–2007	Nasimuddin Hyder	Ernst & Young Pakistan
2007–2008	Imran Afzal	Grant Thornton Pakistan
2008–2009	Syed Asad Ali Shah	Deloitte Pakistan
2009–2010	Abdul Rahim Suriya	A. R. Suriya & Co, Chartered Accountants
2010–2011	Shaikh Saqib Masood	KPMG Pakistan
2011–2012	Rashid Rahman Mir	Rusell Brad Ford Pakistan
2012–2013	Ahmad Saeed	Mazars Consulting
2013–2014	Naeem Akhtar Sheikh	Hassan Naeem & Co.
2014–2015	Yacoob Suttar	Asia Petroleum
2015–2016	Hafiz Mohammad Yousaf	NCBMS Consulting
2016–2017	Nadeem Yousuf Adil	Deloitte Pakistan
2017–2018	Riaz A. Rehman Chamdia	Ernst & Young Pakistan
2018–2019	Jafar Husain	Professionals' Academy of Commerce
2019–2020	Khalilullah Sheikh	Pakistan International Airlines
2020–2022	Iftikhar Taj	Crowe Global Hussain Chaudhury & Co.
2022-2023	Ashfaq Yousuf Tola	Tola Associates
2023-2024	Muhammad Ali Latif	Muniff Ziauddin & Co., Chartered Accountants
2024-2025	Farrukh Rehman	PricewaterhouseCoopers Pakistan

== Course summary ==
Level 1 (PRC) consists of 5 multiple-choice computer-based exams. After successfully completing Level 1, you become eligible to appear for the Level 2 (CAF) exams, which consist of a total of 8 exams, divided into 2 groups of 4. Once you pass all 8 CAF exams, you must undergo an articleship at an accounting firm or in a specific industry, with an average duration of 3 years, depending on your prior qualification. During this articleship period, you will be required to complete the remaining two levels of the program, in order for you to fully qualify.

Course Outline
Stage	Code	Exams		
PRC
PRC	PRC-1	Fundamentals of Accounting		
PRC	PRC-2	Quantitative Analysis for Business		
PRC	PRC-3	Business And Economic Insights		
PRC	CAF	CAF-1	Group A	Financial Accounting and Reporting-I
CAF-2	CAF	Tax Practices	Group A	
CAF-3	CAF	Data, Systems and Risks	Group A	
CAF-4	CAF	Business Law	Group A	
CAF-5	CAF	Group B	Financial Accounting and Reporting-II	
CAF-6	CAF	Group B	Managerial and Financial Analysis	
CAF-7	CAF	Group B	Company Law	
CAF-8	CAF	Group B	Audit and Assurance	
CFAP	CFAP-1	Advanced Accounting and Financial Reporting		
CFAP	CFAP-2	Advanced Corporate Laws and Practices		
CFAP	CFAP-3	Strategy and Performance Measurement		
CFAP	CFAP-4	Business Finance Decisions		
CFAP	CFAP-5	Tax Planning and Practices		
CFAP	CFAP-6	Audit, Assurance and Related Services		
MSA	MSA-1	Financial Reporting and Assurance Professional		
MSA	MSA-2	Management Professional Competence		

== International affiliations ==
ICAP is a member of:

- International Federation of Accountants (IFAC)
- International Accounting Standards Board (IASB)
- Confederation of Asian and Pacific Accountants (CAPA)
- South Asian Federation of Accountants (SAFA)
- IFRS Foundation
- BRI Accounting Forum
- Accounting and Auditing Organization for Islamic Financial Institutions (AAIOFI)
- Chartered Accountants Worldwide (CAW)

== Publications and research ==
ICAP publishes a range of professional and informational publications. Its regular publications include the monthly Newsletter, which provides updates on Institute activities and developments, and The Pakistan Accountant, a quarterly journal featuring articles on accounting, auditing, business, finance, and related topics.

Other notable publications include Artisans of Accountancy, a coffee table book on the history of the accountancy profession in Pakistan, and An Inspiring Journey of a CA Woman, which highlights the contributions of women in the profession.

== Offices ==
ICAP’s head office is located in Clifton, Karachi, with regional offices in Lahore, Islamabad, Multan, Faisalabad, Peshawar, and Quetta. It also maintains an overseas chapter to support members residing abroad. The Institute regularly organizes seminars, workshops, and conferences to engage with stakeholders and promote professional excellence.

In addition, it operates two overseas examination centres in Dubai, United Arab Emirates and Riyadh, Saudi Arabia enabling students residing in the region to appear for its professional examinations.

== See also ==
- Association of Chartered Certified Accountants
- International Federation of Accountants
- Institute of Cost and Management Accountants of Pakistan
- Pakistan Institute of Public Finance Accountants
- Securities and Exchange Commission of Pakistan
