= Institute of Chartered Accountants of Trinidad and Tobago =

- Abbreviation: ICATT
- Predecessor: Trinidad and Tobago Association of Chartered and Certified Accountants
- Formation: 17 September 1970
- Headquarters: Port of Spain, Trinidad and Tobago
- Region served: Trinidad and Tobago
- Members: 1,600
- Official language: English
- President: Denise Chinpire - O'Reilly
- Website: icatt.org

The Institute of Chartered Accountants of Trinidad and Tobago (ICATT) is a professional accountancy body in Trinidad and Tobago. It is the sole organization in Trinidad and Tobago with the right to award the Chartered Accountant designation.

ICATT is a member of the Institute of Chartered Accountants of the Caribbean. ICATT is also a member of the International Federation of Accountants (IFAC). Trinidad and Tobago was one of the first countries to fully adopt International Financial Reporting Standards (IFRS) in 1999. More recently the country adopted IFRS for SMEs in 2010.
