= Iraqi Union of Accountants and Auditors =

- Abbreviation: IUAA
- Headquarters: Baghdad, Iraq
- Region served: Iraq
- Official language: English

The Iraqi Union of Accountants and Auditors (IUAA) is a professional association for accountants and auditors in Iraq. It is the sole Iraqi member of the International Federation of Accountants (IFAC).

== Training activity ==
Between 2004 and 2008 the IUAA received assistance from USAID in upgrading its members to international standards. Training in international methods, methodologies and standards was delivered to 38 master trainers, 802 professional accountants and 437 students. In 2006 the IUAA completed the infrastructure at the IUAA training center, with 28 workstations for student use. The IUAA planned to start a Certified Management Accountant course in 2007. Under the same program, in late 2007 a course on Cost and Management Accounting was delivered to 727 Iraqi students and professional accountants, auditors, businessmen and managers from across Iraq. Also in 2007, the IUAA delivered a course on International Accounting Standards and International Financial Reporting Standards (IAS/IFRS) to employees of the Central Bank of Iraq.

== Controversy ==
In 2010, a letter from the body to various national institutions in Iraq appeared to forbid the international accounting firm Ernst & Young from practising in the country. The firm denied that the Union had any regulatory authority. The firm has employees who are members of the Union, but as it currently has no Iraqi partners it is not yet able to certify audit reports.
