= Institute of Chartered Accountants of Belize =

Belize accountancy organization

- Abbreviation: ICAB
- Formation: November 1, 1984; 42 years ago
- Legal status: Corporation
- Headquarters: Belize City, Belize
- Region served: Belize
- Official language: English
- President: Reynaldo Magaña, CA, CPA
- Vice President: Jose Ortez, CA, ACCA
- Secretary: Rhoda Turner, CA
- Treasurer: Shawn Mahler CA, CISA
- Website: www.icab.bz

Institute of Chartered Accountants of Belize (ICAB) is a professional accountancy body in Belize. It is the sole organization in Belize with the right to award the Chartered Accountant designation. ICAB is a member of the Institute of Chartered Accountants of the Caribbean.
