= Philippine Institute of Certified Public Accountants =

- Logo of PICPA
- Abbreviation: PICPA
- Formation: November 1, 1929; 96 years ago
- Legal status: non-stock corporation; accredited professional organization
- Headquarters: Mandaluyong, Metro Manila, Philippines
- Region served: Philippines
- Official language: English
- President: Dionisio M. Villeta
- Website: www.picpa.com.ph

The Philippine Institute of Certified Public Accountants (PICPA) is the national professional accountancy body of the Philippines. Explorers with an accounting background first formed the PICPA in November 1929. The PICPA focuses on four areas of practice for a CPA: Public Practice, Commerce and Industry, Education, and Government.

== Aims ==
The PICPA was established with the following aims and purposes:

1. To enable the growth profession to discharge its public responsibilities more effectively;
2. To promote and maintain high professional standards in the accountancy profession;
3. To develop among its members high ideals of competence, ethical conduct, integrity, and civic consciousness;
4. To foster cordial, harmonious, and fruitful relations among its members;
5. To elevate the standards of accountancy education;
6. To guard against the practice of the profession by unauthorized persons or entities and in general;
7. To protect and enhance the integrity of the certificate of registration of the Certified Public Accountant;
8. To develop a treaty of friendship among its members.

== See also ==
- Accountancy
- International Federation of Accountants
- Professional Regulation Commission
