= Institute of Certified Public Accountants of Uganda =

Coordinates: 00°20′27″N 32°35′20″E

- Abbreviation: ICPAU, CPA Uganda
- Formation: 31 August 1992; 33 years ago
- Legal status: Organization established by Act of Parliament
- Headquarters: 42 Bukoto Street; Kololo, Kampala, Uganda
- Region served: Uganda
- Products: CPA, ATD, CTA
- Services: Professional accountancy organisation
- Members: c. 3,500 (2019)
- Official language: English
- President: Constant Othieno Mayende
- CEO: Derick Nkajja
- Website: www.icpau.co.ug

The Institute of Certified Public Accountants of Uganda (ICPA Uganda) is a professional body for certified public accountants (CPAs) in Uganda. As of July 2016, total membership was about 2,000.

== Location ==
ICPA Uganda maintains its headquarters at 42 Bukoto Street, on Kololo Hill in Kampala, the capital and largest city of Uganda. The coordinates of the institute's headquarters are 0°20'27.0"N, 32°35'20.0"E (Latitude:0.340833; Longitude:32.588889).

== History ==
ICPAU was established in 1992 by an act of parliament. The first five-member governing council was appointed by the minister of finance in 1993. The first duly elected seven-person council was installed on 8 November 1994 for a three-year renewable term.

== Overview ==
ICPAU is a national professional accountancy organization established to regulate and maintain the standard of accountancy in Uganda. It is also mandated to regulate the conduct of all professional accountants in the country. The members of this organization are employed in public service, private enterprise, government, education, industry, and commerce. In collaboration with the Uganda National Examinations Board (UNEB), the institute organises and administers the professional competency examinations that lead to the recognition of an accountant as a CPA in Uganda.

== Governing council ==
The eleven-person governing council is chaired by ICPA Uganda's president, CPA Constant Othieno Mayende, deputized by CPA Josephine Okui Okwakol Ossiya, the second woman to serve in that capacity since the institute was founded in 1992.

== The secretariat ==
The secretariat is headed by the chief executive officer, Derick Nkajja, who also serves as the secretary to the governing council. He is assisted by three directors, in the following areas: Director of Examinations, Director of Corporate Services, and Director of Standards and Regulations.

The current Director of Education is John Bosco Ntangaare. Director of Corporate Services is CPA Simon Oola, Director of Standards & Regulations is CPA Mark Omona.

== International affiliations ==
ICPAU has been a member of the International Federation of Accountants (IFAC) since 1997.
