= Institute of Chartered Accountants of Namibia =

The Institute of Chartered Accountants of Namibia (ICAN) is a professional accountancy body in Namibia. It is the sole organisation in Namibia with the right to award the Chartered Accountant designation.

ICAN is a member of the International Federation of Accountants (IFAC). ICAN was a charter member of the Pan African Federation of Accountants, which was inaugurated on 5 May 2011.
