= Institute of Indonesia Chartered Accountants =

- Ikatan Akuntan Indonesia
- Abbreviation: IAI
- Formation: December 23, 1957; 68 years ago
- Headquarters: Jakarta, Indonesia
- Region served: Indonesia
- Official language: Bahasa Indonesia
- Website: www.iaiglobal.or.id

The Institute of Indonesia Chartered Accountants, formerly Indonesian Institute of Accountants or Ikatan Akuntan Indonesia (IAI) is the national organisation of professional accountants in Indonesia. IAI is a founding member of the International Federation of Accountants (IFAC) and the ASEAN Federation of Accountants (AFA).

In 2016 IAI became an Associate Member of Chartered Accountants Worldwide.
