= Ordre des Experts Comptables de Tunisie =

- Abbreviation: OECT
- Formation: 1983
- Headquarters: Tunis, Tunisia
- Region served: Tunisia
- Official language: French, Arabic
- President: Mohamed Néji Hergli
- Website: www.oect.org.tn

The Ordre des Experts Comptables de Tunisie (OECT; Institute of Chartered Accountants of Tunisia) is a professional association of accountants in Tunisia. It was created in 1983 and placed under the Ministry of Finance.

The OECT is responsible for ensuring the normal functioning of the accountancy industry, for ensuring that members respect all relevant rules and obligations and for defending the honor and independence of the profession. The institute is a member of the International Federation of Accountants (IFAC) and of the International Federation of Francophone Accountants (FIDEF).

The institute participated in the national campaign for creation and development of SMEs, which was launched in April 2005 by the Ministry of Industry, Energy and SMEs. In May 2007 the institute and FIDEF held a major meeting to discuss the implications and costs involved in moving to the International Financial Reporting Standards (IFRS) for SMEs standard of accounting. In October 2009, due to the 2008 financial crisis, the OECT held a seminar to discuss banking ethics with the assistance of the Central Bank of Tunisia (BCT) and the Professional Association of Tunisian banks and financial institutions (APTBEF). The objective was to raise awareness of this vital subject and reduce risks.

The board of the OECT repeatedly raised concerns about the conduct of members of the Committee of State Auditors, both before and after the Tunisian revolution. On 3 June 2011 a group of 50 accountants filed a complaint of corruption by this body with the high court. Following the confiscation of more than 287 companies belonging to the Ben Ali / Trabelsi clan, in June 2011 the institute held a press conference calling for resolution of the legal status of these companies, which employed about 15,000 people and held investments in many of Tunisia's largest companies.
