= Institute of Authorized Chartered Auditors of Albania =

- Abbreviation: IEKA
- Formation: November 24, 1997; 28 years ago
- Headquarters: Tirana, Albania
- Region served: Albania
- Official language: Albanian
- Chairman: Prof.As.Dr. Hysen Cela
- Website: www.ieka.al

The Institute of Authorized Chartered Auditors of Albania (Instituti i Ekspertëve Kontabël të Autorizuar - IEKA) is a professional body that regulates the accountancy industry in Albania.

IEKA was established on 24 November 1997 as a non-profit professional association for Certified Public Accountants (CPAs) who practice their profession in public. At foundation, IEKA had 56 CPAs. By 2011 the institute had 151 members from 43 auditing companies. The institute was created as a joint initiative by the Albanian government and the World Bank, and is the only licensed body of accountants in the country. IEKA became a member of the International Federation of Accountants (IFAC) in May 2000. IEKA is also a member of the Federation Internationale des Experts-Comptables Francophone (FIDEF) and the South East European Partnership on Accountancy Development (SEEPAD).

International Standards on Auditing (ISAs) are issued by the International Auditing and Assurance Standards Board (IAASB). In 2008 IEKA updated the translation of ISAs into Albanian. IEKA has adopted most IFAC standards and other pronouncements as of 2007 without change, and has an ongoing process of translating, reviewing and publishing new standards in the IEKA professional magazine. An effort is being made to coordinate the translation effort with Kosovo.

In February 2010 the Constitutional Court rejected a draft law under which the Ministry of Finance would oversee a public oversight board, which would monitor the accountancy profession. Apart from understandable objections by IEKA, who would lose authority, it was pointed out that the new law ran counter to European Union directives, and that by effectively establishing a monopoly situation it would handicap efforts to fight corruption in Albania.
