= Institute of Certified Public Accountants in Israel =

- לשכת רואי חשבון בישראל
- Abbreviation: ICPAI
- Members: > 11,000
- Official language: Hebrew
- Website: www.icpas.org.il

The Institute of Certified Public Accountants in Israel (Hebrew: לשכת רואי חשבון בישראל) is a voluntary body of licensed accountants established in 1931. Presently, over 12,000 Israeli Certified Public Accountants are members of the institute. The Institute oversees the accountancy and auditing professions in Israel.

== Qualification ==
There are two different programs for obtaining the auditor's license: an academic and a non-academic program. Approximately 80% of entrants to the profession are via the former.

Through the academic program, one has to receive a bachelor's degree with an accounting dual-major: usually economics or management, and sometimes law; see List of Israeli universities and colleges. Typically students then study for a "supplemental" specialization year, (שנת השלמה) focused on accountancy and taxation. Following this, students must pass two final exams in advanced financial accountancy and advanced auditing set by the Institute. Students then undertake a two-year apprenticeship.

The non-academic program is based on self-study (and/or lectures at non-academic schools). The candidate must pass 15 external exams. Students then complete the apprenticeship as per the academic program. The exams are administered in four sessions as follows:

- Interim A: trade calculations, introduction to economics, introduction to accountancy
- Interim B: costing and managerial accountancy, auditing, introduction to law
- Final A: financial accountancy, trade and labor laws, corporate law, statistics, funding
- Final B: advanced managerial accountancy, tax law, advanced auditing, advanced financial accountancy.
