= Liberian Institute of Certified Public Accountants =

- Abbreviation: LICPA
- Official language: English

The Liberian Institute of Certified Public Accountants (LICPA) is a professional association of accountants in Liberia.

LICPA is a member body of the International Federation of Accountants (IFAC). The Institute was established by an Act of the Liberian Legislature. In 2011 a revised version of the act was going through legislative review. Assuming the act is passed, Liberia will adopt the International Financial Reporting Standards.

Liberians with bachelor's degrees in Accounting are allowed to sit for examinations to become Certified Accountants. In May 2011 fourteen candidates from LICPA sat an international accounting exam at Cuttington University in Congo Town. Successful students would be eligible for admission as professional members of the Institute of Chartered Accountants of Ghana (ICAG). Later that month a workshop was organized by the World Bank, the Liberian Ministry of Finance and the LICPA to underline improvement in LICPA standards.

== History ==
The Liberian Institute of Certified Public Accountant (LICPA) is the national Professional Accounting Organization (PAO) of Liberia. It originally came into being, in 1933, as The Institute of Certified Public Accountants of Liberia Limited, under authority of an Act of the National Legislature of Liberia in that year. However, for reasons that are not clear, the Institute became and remained inactive and dormant for many years until the early 1980s, when a group of Liberian accountants (principal among them Sam D. Monbo Sr., Edwin Sambola, Emmanuel Shaw, Francis B. S. Johnson, John Bestman, and Wreh Dargbe) took steps to revive the dormant Institute. The institute was reactivated in 1984 and renamed the Liberian Institute of Certified Public Accountants (LICPA) and became a full-fledged member of the Accounting Bodies of West Africa. Sam D. Monbo Sr became the founding President with Edwin Sambola as founding Vice President. However, the efforts to modernize the act of LICPA in so to become an effective PAO of consequence were shortly aborted at the beginning of the 13-year Liberian civil war that started in 1989. In 1994, Mr. Francis B. S. Johnson became president of LICPA while Sam D. Monbo Sr became Executive Director/Vice President. Up to 2011 LICPA leadership led efforts to establish the Institute as an effective, binding PAO supported by government.

A New Beginning Effective June 3, 2011, the Government of Liberia passed into law the Liberian Institute of Certified Public Accountants (LICPA) Act, Section 8 of which empowers the Institute to among other things:

(1) “regulate the practice of accounting and accounting-related consultancy as well as the professional conduct of accountants and auditors in Liberia by establishing and enforcing accounting, auditing and other assurance engagement standards in Liberia;

(2) determine, set, adapt or adopt and promulgate standards and rules of general and specific application to accounting and auditing in Liberia that are appropriate for the private sector of Liberia;

(3) determine, adopt and promulgate quality control standards and assist audit firms with their implementation;

(4) Implement Quality Assurance requirements to ensure the quality of the work undertaken by auditors; and ensure..”

In addition, per Section 25 of the Act, “the authority to certify or otherwise accredit any and all professional accountants within the Republic of Liberia is hereby exclusively reserved to the Liberian Institute of Certified Public Accountants (LICPA).”

== Professional Credentialing Examinations ==
In 2008, the LICPA joined the national institutes of Ghana and Nigeria in promoting a semi-professional credentialing examinations known as the Accounting Technicians Scheme, West Africa (ATSWA. The ATSWA exams, which are a uniform mid level exam for accountants in West Africa, are currently administered in English speaking West Africa under the auspices of the Association of Accountancy Bodies in West Africa (ABWA) of which the LICPA is a founding member. ATSWA exams is currently administered, as a foundation professional exam for aspiring professional accountants, in all but one English-speaking countries in West Africa, the sole exception being The Gambia, which expects to commence the ATSWA exam in September, 2014. Professional Examinations The LICPA does not yet have a full professional accounting credentialing program of its own. However, under a Memorandum of Understanding signed with the Institute of Chartered Accountants, Ghana (ICAG)in 2010, the LICPA, starting 2011, administers the professional accounting examination of the Ghanaian Institute as the LICPA's pre-admission exams. Based on the results of that examination, a successful LICPA candidate becomes eligible for admission into the Institute as a Certified Public Accountant (CPA), Liberia and also into the Ghanaian Institute as a Chartered Accountant, Ghana (CA, Gh). Accounting Education in Liberian Universities Under funding provided by the United States Agency for International Development (USAID) under its Governance Economic Management Support (GEMS) program to Liberia, the Liberian Institute has, starting September 2013, launched a program, called Syllabi Integration Program (SIP), which aims to raise the standards of accounting education in Liberia to a global level within five years, and in the process also correct a number of ills that are endemic in the educational system of Liberia. Under the Program, the Institute integrates the syllabi of the two credentialing programs mentioned above (ATSWA and the ICAG Professional exams) into the accounting curricula of Liberian tertiary institutions of learning that elect to partner with the LICPA in its national capacity building effort. The syllabi integration is such that students in participating schools are expected to qualify as professional accountants by the time they meet standard academic requirements for graduation or be close to doing so by then. The idea is that having been brought that close to professional qualification, students in participating schools who do not qualify as professional accountants by the time they complete the academic requirements of each participating school will, on their own seek professional qualification on their own even after graduation. The Institute expects that this way, it will substantially increase number of Liberian professional accountants, who are currently in very short supply. Under the Program student in participating schools are required to pass corresponding external exams administered by LICPA, as part of the credentialing programs outlined above, in order to obtain academic credit in his school. However, the Council of the Institute recognizes that, unless suitably ameliorated, that requirement is inherently unfair to students at participating institutions where, with rare exceptions, the instructors who teach in those schools are unfamiliar with professional accounting exams. To address that challenge, the Institute works in collaboration with the Liberian Institute of Public Administration (LIPA), a funding beneficiary of the GEMS program of the USAID in Liberia. Thus under funding provided for the purpose by the USAID, the two Liberian capacity building institutes hire the services of experienced expatriate professional accountants who teach at participating universities as full-time instructors whose specific brief includes coaching students in each participating university to pass the LICPA's semi-professional and its full professional exams. Together with GEMS, the two partnering institutes hire the instructors; LIPA handles administration of the Program while the LICPA concentrates on the academic aspects of the Program. Although GEMS pays the expatriate instructors hired under the Program as outlined above, participating schools are allowed to collect tuition from students, with the specific understanding that each school will then use the tuition collected to sponsor as many of its regular accounting instructors, who so desire, to take the professional exams of the LICPA. Separate tutorial classes and separate examination centers are to be maintained for instructors, who will not be required to sit in the same classrooms or take any exams at the same centers with regular students. Successful instructors then join the GEMS supported teaching pool; initialing limiting the number of expatriate teaching staff that are brought into Liberia in the hope that eventually they will fully replace their expatriate counterparts. This way, the SIP is expected to become indefinitely sustainable, starting five (5) years or so from its inception. All parties, GEMS, USAID, the World Bank, LICPA, the Liberian Institute of Public Administration (LIPA) and the authorities of participating tertiary institutions readily agree that the SIP has great potential for advancing the quality of accounting education in Liberia to global standards.

== Continuing Professional Development Programs ==
In 2010, in collaboration with the Central Bank of Liberia and the Liberia Bankers’ Association, the Institute organized a ten-day IFRS training workshop for accountants working in the banking sector of Liberia. Until 2014, that was the only Continuing Professional Development (CPD) course ever offered by the Institute. Starting February, 2014, the Institute has commenced a series of CPD courses some of which are targeted for LICPA members in practice while others are intended and designed for nonmembers as well.

In 2013, in collaboration with the Institute of Chartered Accountants, Ghana (ICAG), the LICPA conducted seven (7) Continuing Professional Education (CPD) courses that attracted a large number of participants, number seventy five (75) or significantly above for all courses offered. The Institute plans to offer more along the same line in the foreseeable future.

== Quality Control Programs ==
Section 17 of the LICPA Act requires the Governing Council of the Institute to consider and put in place a credible quality assurance program under which the Council can be assured that members of the Institute who are in public practice are in compliance with applicable IFAC standards in their service to the public. Starting February 2014, the Institute has also commenced a program of quality inspection of the professional work of its members. However, in compliance with the requirements of Section 17 of the Act, the Council has, also starting February, 2014, commenced an enrichment program that is designed to empower members ”in a handholding, coaching and mentoring manner” to meet the quality standards required by the Act. It is intended that this initial phase will then be followed by field inspection of the work of practicing members of the LICPA.

== Twinning Partnerships ==
Twinning Partnership with the Institute of Chartered Accountants, Ghana (ICAG)

Under support funding that the World Bank has provided to the Institute, the LICPA, in June 2013, entered into a Twinning Partnership (World Bank terminology), whereby the Ghanaian Institute mentors the Liberian Institute to become a strong member of the International Federation of Accountants (IFAC). This is to enable members of the Institute, particularly those in public practice, improve their skills to acceptable international standards.

== Membership in Professional Accounting Organizations ==
The LICPA is a member of the Association of Accountancy Bodies in West Africa (ABWA), of which the President of the LICPA is also the current (May 2013 to May 2015) President. The Presidency of ABWA is rotated among the member accountancy bodies of the Association. On that basis a member body, rather than any individual, is voted into office as President or Vice President of the Association. The revised constitution of ABWA requires that the posts of President and Vice President be alternated among the English-speaking and the French-speaking member bodies. On this basis when the current President is from an English-speaking member body the Vice President is elected from a French-speaking member body and vice versa.

The Liberian Institute is also a founding member of the Pan African Federation of Accountants (PAFA). Because the LICPA currently holds the Presidency of ABWA, its President also represents the West African Region on the Board of PAFA.

The LICPA has been a full member of the International Federation of Accountants (IFAC) since 1982. In addition, the LICPA is a founding member of the Liberian Institute of Tax Practitioners (LITP).
