= Institute of Chartered Accountants of Zimbabwe =

Professional accounting organization in Zimbabwe

- Type: Professional association
- Purpose: Encourage professionalism in accountancy in Zimbabwe
- Official language: English
- President: Duduzile Shinya (nee Mothobi)
- Website: https://www.icaz.org.zw/

The Institute of Chartered Accountants of Zimbabwe (ICAZ) is a professional accountancy body in Zimbabwe. It is the sole organization in Zimbabwe with the right to award the Chartered Accountant designation.

ICAZ is a member of the International Federation of Accountants (IFAC). ICAZ was a charter member of the Pan African Federation of Accountants, which was inaugurated on 5 May 2011. ICAZ is also a full member of the Eastern Central and Southern African Federation of Accountants.

In January 2010, 134 candidates to become chartered accountants passed part one of the Qualifying Examinations. With 216 students sitting the examination, the pass rate was 62%.

On 28 June 2011, ICAZ hosted a one-day tax conference in Harare with focus on taxpayers' rights to tax privacy, customs valuation of goods and international commercial terms.

In January 2018, ICAZ past president Martin Makaya stated that a sample by ICAZ of six state-owned entities had shown that only two chartered accountants were sitting on their boards, out of 32 board members in total. This compared poorly to the boards of companies listed on the Zimbabwe Stock Exchange and boards of banking companies.
