= Institute of Singapore Chartered Accountants =

Singaporean professional body

- Abbreviation: ISCA
- Formation: 24 June 1963; 63 years ago
- Headquarters: Singapore
- Members: ▲40,000
- President: Teo Ser Luck
- Vice Presidents: Choo Eng Beng; Judy Ng
- Chief Executive Officer: Fann Kor
- Website: www.isca.org.sg
- Formerly called: Singapore Society of Accountants; Institute of Certified Public Accountants of Singapore

The Institute of Singapore Chartered Accountants (ISCA) is the national accountancy body of Singapore. It was established in 1963 and has over 40,000 members.

== Registration of public accountant ==
Currently, the Singapore Public Accountants Oversight Committee (PAOC) of the Accounting and Corporate Regulatory Authority, established under the Accountants Act to determine, prescribe and review the requirements to be satisfied by people seeking to be registered as public accountants in Singapore, will not register any person as a public accountant unless the person is a Chartered Accountant of Singapore registered with ISCA.

== Global Accountancy Hub ==
The Singapore Government has plans to develop Singapore into a global accountancy hub, as outlined in recommendations by the Committee to Develop the Accountancy Sector (CDAS). With the Ministry of Finance having approved CDAS' recommendations, plans are underway for ISCA to transform into a global professional accountancy body. ISCA shall also be administering a post-graduate accountancy qualification programme that shall connote global recognition, international portability and an “Asian market value factor”. As the accountancy sector continues to develop, ISCA shall provide the support that will propel Singapore's growth as a global accountancy hub.

== International Links ==
ISCA is a member body of the following international or regional organisations:

- Asean Federation of Accountants (AFA)
- Asia Oceania Tax Consultants' Association (AOTCA)
- INSOL International (International Association of Restructuring, Insolvency & Bankruptcy Professionals)
- International Accounting Standards Board (IASB)
- International Federation of Accountants (IFAC)
- Chartered Accountants Worldwide
- International Innovation Network
- INSOL International
