= Institute of Chartered Accountants of Sierra Leone =

- Type: Professional association
- Official language: English
- Website: http://www.ica-sl.org/

The Institute of Chartered Accountants of Sierra Leone (ICASL) is a professional accountancy body in Sierra Leone. It is the sole organization in Sierra Leone with the right to award the Chartered Accountant designation. ICASL is a member of the International Federation of Accountants (IFAC).
