= Institute of Chartered Accountants of Barbados =

Organization of Barbados

- Type: Professional association
- Region served: Barbados
- Official language: English
- Website: http://www.icab.bb/

The Institute of Chartered Accountants of Barbados (ICAB) is a professional accountancy body in Barbados. It is the sole organisation in Barbados with the right to award the Chartered Accountant designation. ICAB is a member of the International Federation of Accountants (IFAC). ICAB is also a member of the Institute of Chartered Accountants of the Caribbean.
