= Bahamas Institute of Chartered Accountants =

- Abbreviation: BICA
- Formation: 6 August 1971; 55 years ago
- Headquarters: Nassau, Bahamas
- Region served: Bahamas
- Official language: English
- President: Darnell Osborne
- President Elect: Gowon Bowe
- Website: http://www.bica.bs/

The Bahamas Institute of Chartered Accountants (BICA) is a professional body that regulates the accountancy industry in the Bahamas. In theory anyone approved by the relevant government ministry can act as an independent auditor, but in practice, all auditors are members of BICA.

== History ==
BICA was formed by Maitland Cates, Basil Sands and Clifford Culmer, who were among the first Bahamians to qualify as chartered accountants in the 1960s. The Bahamas Institute of Chartered Accountants was incorporated on 6 August 1971. BICA became a member of the International Federation of Accountants in 1978, and a member of The Institute of Chartered Accountants of The Caribbean on 28 October 1988. The Public Accountants Act 1991 was enacted on 17 July 1991, empowering the institute to regulate and govern the accounting industry in the Bahamas. On 18 June 2011 BICA celebrated its fortieth anniversary with a banquet at the Atlantis Grand Ballroom. BICA has over 300 active licensees and 500 members and associates at 31 December 2015.

== Objectives ==
BICA defines the qualifications required of accountants in the Bahamas, regulates the professional conduct of members, associates, students, and public accountants who are not members, and promotes the interests of the accounting profession. The institute promotes best practices of financial reporting, promotes professional education of accountants, provides for education and examination of professionals, arranges lectures and discussions and disseminates information.

== Other organisations ==
BICA is a member of the International Federation of Accountants (IFAC). BICA is also a member of the Institute of Chartered Accountants of the Caribbean.
