= The Institute of Chartered Accountants of Bangladesh =

- Abbreviation: ICAB
- Formation: 1973
- Type: National Professional Accounting Body
- Professional title: ACA, FCA
- Headquarters: 100 Kazi Nazrul Islam Avenue; Dhaka-1215, Bangladesh
- Region served: Bangladesh
- Members: 1898
- Official language: English
- President: Sabbir Ahmed FCA
- Vice-President: Neaz Mohammed FCA
- Main organ: Council - ICAB
- Affiliations: IFAC, IASB, CAPA, SAFA, AOTCA, ICAEW
- Website: www.icab.org.bd

The Institute of Chartered Accountants of Bangladesh (ICAB) is the national professional accountancy body and research institute in Bangladesh. It is the sole organisation in Bangladesh with the right to award the Associate Chartered Accountant designation. It has 2,005 members.

== History ==
It was established under the Bangladesh Chartered Accountant Order 1973 (Presidential Order No. 2 of 1973). The Ministry of Commerce, Government of the People's Republic of Bangladesh is the administrative Ministry of ICAB.

== Regional branches ==
ICAB has Regional Offices in Dhaka, the capital of Bangladesh, and in Chittagong, Rajshahi, Rangpur, Khulna, Barishal, Sylhet, Mymensingh. There are also Chapter Management Committee Offices both in London, UK and Ontario, Canada.

== Information concerning memberships and contract signing ==
This organisation is a member of the following institutions:

- the International Federation of Accountants (IFAC)
- the International Accounting Standards Board (IASB)
- the Confederation of Asian and Pacific Accountants (CAPA)
- the South Asian Federation of Accountants (SAFA)
- the Asia Oceania Tax Consultants' Association (AOTCA)

Moreover, this organisation has signed a Memorandum of Understanding (MoU) with the Institute of Chartered Accountants of England and Wales (ICAEW) on 26 October 2010.

== See also ==
- List of accounting firms in Bangladesh
