= Institute of Chartered Accountants of Ghana =

Professional accountancy organization in Ghana

The Institute of Chartered Accountants of Ghana is a professional accountancy organisation. It is the sole such organisation in Ghana with the right to award the Chartered Accountant designation, and with the right to regulate the accountancy profession in Ghana. The Institute of Chartered Accountants (Ghana) was established by an Act of Parliament, Act 170, in 1963.Act 170 was repealed in 2020 after the President of the Republic of Ghana assented to a new Act, Institute of Chartered Accountants, Ghana Act, 2020, Act 1058. Members of the organisation are the only persons recognized under the Companies Code (Act 179) 1963, to pursue audits of company accounts in Ghana. It is governed by a council of eleven members who are chartered accountants. The council, headed by a president, holds office for a period of two years.

Institute of Chartered Accountants, Ghana is a member of two international bodies, the sub-regional ABWA or Association of Accountancy Bodies in West Africa, and the International Federation of Accountants (IFAC), the worldwide organization for the accountancy profession.

== Past presidents ==
- Dr. R. S. Amegashie - 1963 to 1967
- Mr. S. W. Awuku Darko - 1967 to 1969
- Nana Aninkora Ababio (Mr. S. I. K. Boakye-Agyeman) - 1969 to 1974
- Mr. H. A. Dodoo - 1974 to 1976
- Mr. J. K. Dadson - 1976 to 1978
- Mr. D. H. Simpson - 1978 to 1980
- Prof. B. C. F. Lokko - 1980 to 1982
- Mr. J. K. Forson - 1982 to 1984
- Mr. E. M. Boye - 1984 to 1986
- Mr. S. O. Annan - 1986 to 1988
- Mr. K. N. Owusu - 1988 to 1990
- Nii Quaye Mensah - 1990 to 1992
- Mr. P. A. Abotsie - 1992 to 1994
- Mr. John Sey - 1994 to 1996
- Hon. Albert Kan-Dapaah - 1996 to 1996
- Mr. J. N. A. Hyde - 1996 to 1998
- Mr. F. D. Tweneboa - 1998 to 2000
- Ms. Aurore Lokko - 2000 to 2002
- Mr. J. A. Y. Klinogo - 2002 to 2004
- Mr. D. T. DAcquaye - 2004 to 2006
- Nana Prof. Ato Ghartey - 2006 to 2008
- Mrs. Cecilia Nyann - 2008 to 2010
- Mr. Joseph F. O. Blankson - 2010 to 2012
