= South Asian Federation of Accountants =

South Asian Federation of Accountants (SAFA)
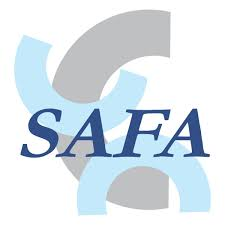
- Status: A forum under SAARC
- President: Mr. Heshana Kuruppu
- Vice President: Mr. Ashfaq Yousuf Tola
- Website: www.esafa.org

The South Asian Federation of Accountants (SAFA) is a forum of professional accounting bodies in the South Asian Association of Regional Cooperation (SAARC) region of eight nations. It works in the public interest and towards broad economic development of the region in part through promoting harmonization of accounting standards and practices.

It was founded in 1984. The strategy of the organization is not to create new standards, but rather to promote harmonization by building common knowledge and adoption of International Accounting Standards (IAS, which accommodates regional/national variations).

Former presidents of the SAFA include Jamal Uddin Ahmad.
