= Institute of Chartered Accountants of Guyana =

Organization of Guyana

- Logo of the institute
- Abbreviation: ICAG
- Predecessor: Association of Certified Corporate Accountants
- Formation: November 9, 1966; 59 years ago
- Legal status: Statutory body corporate
- Headquarters: Georgetown, Guyana
- Coordinates: 6.818783°N 58.163756°W
- Region served: Guyana
- Members: 65
- Official language: English
- President: Vishwamint Ramnaraine
- Vice President: David Dharamraj
- Secretary: Raan Motilall
- Treasurer: Amrita Singh - Henriques
- Board of directors: Vasudeo Singh, Harry Parmesar, Ramesh Seebarran, Colin Thompson
- Website: www.icag.org.gy

The Institute of Chartered Accountants of Guyana (ICAG) is a professional body in Guyana that regulates the accountancy industry and arranges for ongoing training of its members.

== History ==
Until 1956, accountants in Guyana belonged to the UK-based Association of Certified Corporate Accountants. On 9 November 1966 the Guyana Association of Accountants was incorporated by eight professional accountants. On 11 July 1974 the organization was renamed the Institute of Chartered Accounts of Guyana. The current institute is incorporated under the Institute of Chartered Accountants of Guyana Act 1991, which defines the structure, duties, powers and so on.

== Activities ==
The institute is engaged in training and regulation of professional accountants in Guyana. ICAG is a joint examination scheme partner of the Association of Chartered Certified Accountants (ACCA). ICAG and ACCA jointly run a practice-monitoring programme, and by the end of 2010 all members had been visited once. ICAG is a member of the International Federation of Accountants (IFAC). The institute is also a member of the Institute of Chartered Accountants of the Caribbean (ICAC). On 25–27 June 2009, ICAG hosted the ICAC 27th Annual Conference of Accountants at the Guyana International Conference Centre.

Harryram Parmessar of the ICAG was appointed president of ICAC for a 2009–2011 term. Speaking in a newspaper interview in August 2009, Parmessar noted the great difficulty of retaining qualified accountants within the country. He said that 25 accountants were trained by the institute each year, but half of them migrated to North America or elsewhere. In a partial effort to address the problem, the government of Guyana now allows any ACCA-qualified Caricom national to practise accountancy in the country, where before only citizens could practise. He noted that discussions on uniform Caribbean company law and Caribbean tax law had never got far, but should be pursued to help make accountants more mobile.
