= South African Institute of Professional Accountants =

- Abbreviation: SAIPA
- Headquarters: Midrand, South Africa
- Region served: South Africa
- Members: > 10 000
- Chief Executive: Tia van der Sandt
- Chairperson of the Board: Radha Gouri (Prem) Govender
- Vice-Chairperson: Lynné Smit
- Board of directors: Bruce Banda Abel Mangolele Brandon Rajah Nqobani Mzizi Pitso Zwane Deshni Subbiah Clayton Ellis
- Website: www.saipa.co.za
- Formerly called: Institute of Certified Public Accountants of South Africa

The South African Institute of Professional Accountants (SAIPA) is a professional association of accountants based in South Africa. As of 2019, the institute claims to have more than 10,000 members.

SAIPA represents qualified Professional Accountants (SA) in practice, commerce and industry, academia and the public sector.

== Recognition ==
SAIPA is a professional body registered with South African Qualification Authority (SAQA) and has a number of registered professional designations.

In 1995 SAIPA became a full member of the International Federation of Accountants (IFAC), and today is one of only two accountancy bodies in South Africa that are full members.

In terms of the Tax Administration Act 28 of 2011, South African Revenue Service (SARS) will only register members of approved professional bodies as tax practitioners. Only registered tax practitioners may provide advice with respect to the application of a tax law, and complete or assists in completing a return for another person or company. SAIPA is a SARS recognised controlling body of the tax profession in South Africa.

SAIPA has a Centre of Tax Excellence (CoTE) for tax practitioners who practice and specialise in the field of taxation.

== Qualification ==
The requirements for membership are:

- Academic: A Degree with a major in financial accounting and with tax, management accounting, auditing and commercial law as subjects.
- Practical training or experience: at least 3 years under a SAIPA recognised Learnership, or 6 years of relevant verifiable experience.
- SAIPA Professional Evaluation: a five-hour examination offered twice yearly covering Financial Accounting, Auditing, Taxation, Commercial Law, Management Accounting, and Practice Management.
