= Institute of Chartered Accountants of Nepal =

National professional accounting body in Nepal

- नेपाल चार्टर्ड एकाउन्टेन्ट्स संस्था
- Emblem of ICAN
- Abbreviation: ICAN
- Nickname: ICAN
- Formation: January 30, 1997; 29 years ago
- Legal status: Body corporate established by the Nepal Chartered Accountants Act, 1997 passed by the Parliament of Nepal
- Headquarters: Lalitpur, Nepal
- Region served: Nepal
- Members: 9052 (2022/2023)
- Official language: Nepali, English
- President: FCA. Nil Saru Magar
- Vice President: FCA. Anand Kumar Sharma Wagle
- Immediate Past President: FCA. Prabin Kumar Jha
- Students: 11227 (2022/2023)
- Website: en.ican.org.np/en/

The Institute of Chartered Accountants of Nepal (ICAN) is the national professional accounting body in Nepal, responsible for regulating and promoting the accounting profession in the country. Established in 1997 under the Nepal Chartered Accountants Act, ICAN sets standards for auditing, financial reporting, and ethical conduct for accountants in Nepal

== Total members (2023/24) ==
Member	Total
Chartered Accountants	2220
Registered Auditors - B	3432
Registered Auditors - C	1546
Registered Auditors - D	2231

== Controversies ==
=== Tax exemption controversy ===
Two practising chartered accountants, Lumba Dhwaj Mahat and Umesh Prasad Dhakal, were involved in misappropriating state tax revenue through dubious tax settlements as Chairman and Member of Tax Settlement Commission involving Chudamani Sharma, Director General of Inland Revenue Department (Nepal). The corruption scam was considered as one of the biggest in the Nepalese history. ICAN disciplinary committee failed to take any action against the two accused CAs. Vice-Chairman Jagannath Upadhyay Niraula said that "the disciplinary committee can take action only after receiving information or the complaint is lodged against any chartered accountant. We have not received any complaint against the duo." The fraud amounted to NRs. 21 billion. Both the CAs have fled from the incident and were declared fugitive by Commission for the Investigation of Abuse of Authority.

=== Bharatpur Listing controversy ===
46 Nepalese audit firms, including the firm of former President of ICAN CA Prakash Jung Thapa (i.e. PJ Thapa & Company), were listed in the Bharatpur Municipality against the legal regulations of ICAN. On 18 October 2019, ICAN President Krishna Prasad Acharya has declared to punish the audit firms for conducting such illegal listing.
