= South African Institute of Chartered Accountants =

Institute in South Africa

- Abbreviation: SAICA
- Predecessor: The Institute of Accountants and Auditors
- Formation: 1894
- Legal status: Chartered Body
- Headquarters: Johannesburg, South Africa
- Region served: South Africa
- Website: www.saica.org.za

The South African Institute of Chartered Accountants (SAICA) is South Africa’s pre-eminent body for accountants and one of the leading institutes globally. As a Non-Profit Organisation led by CEO Patricia Stock, it provides support services to over 63,297 members and associates. The institute oversees three primary professional designations: Chartered Accountant [CA(SA)], Associate General Accountant [AGA(SA)], and Accounting Technician [AT(SA)].

Membership and Statistics

As of May 2026, the total membership and associate base reached 63,297. SAICA provides support, advice, and services to its members throughout their professional lives.

Designation	Total	Local	International
Chartered Accountant (CA)	57,057	45,385	11,672
Associate General Accountant (AGA)	5,722	5,498	224
Accounting Technician (AT)	518	518	0

Demographic Highlights (May 2026):

- Gender: 28,011 Female and 35,286 Male
- Age: 18,899 members are under the age of 35, while 44,398 are over the age of 35
- Disability Status: 452 members (including 405 CAs and 47 AGAs) are registered as disabled.

== Regional representation ==
SAICA is constituted of four local regional offices as well as two international representative offices, which serve members based in those respective regions. The regions are as follows;

- Northern Region (Gauteng, Mpumalanga and Limpopo provinces);
- Eastern Region (KwaZulu-Natal province);
- Southern Region (Western Cape and Eastern Cape provinces);
- Central Region (Free State, North West and Northern Cape provinces);
- SAICA Australia;
- SAICA United Kingdom (UK).

== International Involvement and CPA Equivalency ==
SAICA is a member of the Global Accounting Alliance (GAA) and maintains a significant international footprint with 11,896 members based outside of South Africa.

A South African CA(SA) is considered the equivalent of a United States CPA (Certified Public Accountant). A historical legal distinction exists in South Africa where "CPA" was previously used by other bodies; however, through SAICA's advocacy, the term is now strictly regulated to avoid international confusion.

== History ==
The roots of the profession in South Africa date back to 1894 with the formation of the Institute of Accountants and Auditors in Johannesburg. The move toward a national body culminated in 1980 with the formal establishment of SAICA.

Key milestones include the Chartered Accountants Designation (Private) Act of 1927, which protected the CA(SA) title, and the 1951 Public Accountants and Auditors Act, which introduced formal regulation for auditors in public practice.

Although it did not become a regular publication till 1954, the journal was the sole communication vehicle aimed directly at members and indicated a need for unification. Between 1905 and 1907 accounting societies were established, naming Cape Colony, The Orange River Colony and Natal. By the end of 1907, the Transvaal Society of Accountants (which represented more than a half of the registered accountants in South Africa) had grown to 522 members.

From the earliest times attempts were made to form a national body. The first meaningful step took place on 6 May 1921 when the South African Accounting Societies' General Examining Board was formed to conduct the examination process on behalf of the societies. The second major milestone on the road to unification occurred in 1927, when the Chartered Accountants Designation (Private) Act was passed by parliament. The Act provided protection for the CA(SA) allowing only members of the then provincial societies to use it

But the world and local politics at the time hampered efforts towards forming a national body and it was only in 1945 that the Joint Council of the Societies of Chartered Accountants (SA), which provided a forum for co-operation between the societies, was formed. In 1950 all theoretical teaching and examining were handed over to universities, but the profession retained the right to set the qualifying examination. The first CTA examinations were held in 1951. The Public Accountants and Auditors Act was also promulgated in 1951, and it brought into place the regulation of accountants and auditors in public practice. The General Examining Board continued to set the qualifying examination until 1957 when it was taken over by the Public Accountants' and Auditors' Board (PAAB).

In 1966 The National Council of Chartered Accountants came into being with its own small secretariat – a further step in the process for unification which was finally achieved in 1980 when the South African Institute of Chartered Accountants was formed with 9012 members. 1973 saw the enactment of a new Companies Act and with it the requirement of companies to present financial statements in accordance with generally accepted accounting practice. The profession, together with chambers of commerce and the Johannesburg Stock Exchange, formed the Accounting Practices Board to issue statements of Generally Accepted Accounting Practice.

== An Era of Change ==
With the beginnings of globalization, the profession internationally felt the need to work more closely together. This led to the creation of IFAC in 1977 and South Africa was one of the founder members. Although the first woman CA(SA), Miss Elizabeth Kruger, qualified in 1917, it was not until 1977 that Wiseman Nkuhlu was admitted as the first black African CA(SA).

The 1980s proved to be an era of change. While SAICA established numerous committees to improve its service to members and to set standards, the profession recognised the need to open the doors to more black and female CAs(SA). A committee, under the chairmanship of Brian Hawksworth, began to promote this initiative. In 1987 the CAs' Eden Trust came into being as a joint effort between SAICA, the PAAB and the Association for the Advancement of Black Accountants (ABASA) to provide bursaries and grow the number of black CAs(SA). The Eden Trust assisted over 100 black accountants to qualify. In 2002 its name was changed to the Thuthuka Bursary Fund and it was fully incorporated into the institute's transformation and growth strategy.

== Future ==
SAICA is a non-profit, voluntary body that provides a wide range of services to its members and associates. It is controlled by a Board, elected by members through regional committees, and by bodies representing the Institute's other key constituencies such as members in business (commerce and industry), large practices, small practices and ABASA. The IRBA is the statutory body controlling that part of the accountancy profession involved with public accountancy in the Republic of South Africa.

It is important to stress that all entrants to the accountancy profession are subject to consistent requirements. Following qualification, chartered accountants entering public practice are required to register with the IRBA, whilst keeping their SAICA membership, and are governed by its regulations. Those qualified chartered accountants practicing outside of public practice are not subject to the jurisdiction of the IRBA but are subject to the jurisdiction of SAICA. The IRBA functions in terms of the Auditing Profession Act, 2005 (Act 26 of 2005). Its members are appointed by the Minister of Finance and not more than 40% of the members of the IRBA Board may be registered auditors.

The IRBA is partly funded by fees and levies payable by registered auditors and partly by the National Treasury. The IRBA reports annually to the Minister of Finance, who then tables the report in Parliament.

The mission of the IRBA, on the other hand, is to protect the financial interest of the South African public and international investors in South Africa, through the effective regulation of audits conducted by registered auditors and accountants, and in accordance with internationally recognised standards and processes. This is achieved by providing the means and the regulatory framework for the education and training of adequate numbers of competent and disciplined accountants and auditors, to serve the needs of South Africa. The Board strives constantly towards the maintenance and improvement of standards of registered auditors. It protects the public who rely on the services of registered auditors and supports registered auditors who carry out their duties competently, fearlessly and in good faith.

SAICA went into a strategic evolution known as Project Recalibrate. This initiative is designed to ensure the organisation remains agile and responsive to the shifting needs of the global financial landscape while deepening the value provided to its 63,297 members and associates. SAICA is expanding its Continuous Professional Development (CPD) offerings to ensure members are equipped with future-fit skills, particularly in data analytics and sustainability reporting.

The institute is heightening its role as a representative voice for the profession, engaging with government and international bodies to protect the integrity of South African designations. Following the launch of the ISSB standards in 2023, SAICA is positioning its members as leaders in ESG (Environmental, Social, and Governance) reporting. The future will see members moving beyond traditional financial metrics to become "Difference Makers" who drive sustainable value and ethical leadership across all sectors of the economy.

== Designations and Core Areas ==
Chartered Accountant [CA(SA)] The CA(SA) is the premier designation for expertise in accountancy theory and practice.

- Core Areas: Auditing, Financial Management, Taxation, and Strategic Leadership.
- Requirements: An accredited degree, CTA, a three-year training contract, and passing two professional exams (ITC and APC).

Associate General Accountant [AGA(SA)]

AGAs are highly skilled in technical accounting and mid-level management.

- Core Areas: Financial accounting and reporting, managerial accounting, auditing systems, internal control, and taxation.
- Requirements: A SAICA-accredited BCom degree and an accredited training programme.

Associate Accounting Technician [AT(SA)]

ATs focus on essential support roles within the finance function of an organisation.

- Core Areas: Payroll accounting, inventory control, sales and credit control, and basic budgeting.
- Requirements: A two-year training contract and passing the required examination.
