= International Federation of Accountants =

Global organization advocating for the accounting profession

- Abbreviation: IFAC
- Formation: October 7, 1977; 49 years ago
- Type: INGO
- Legal status: Association established under Swiss Civil Code
- Purpose: Strengthening the worldwide accountancy profession
- Headquarters: New York City, United States
- Location: Geneva, Switzerland
- Region served: 130 countries and jurisdictions worldwide
- Members: 180
- Official language: English
- CEO: Lee White (from March 2024)
- President: Jean Bouquot (from November 2024)
- Main organ: Council
- Website: www.ifac.org

The International Federation of Accountants (IFAC) is the global organization for the accountancy profession. Founded in 1977, IFAC has 180 members and associates in 135 jurisdictions, representing more than 3 million accountants in public practice, education, government service, industry, and commerce. The organization supports the development, adoption, and implementation of international standards for accounting education, ethics, and the public sector as well as audit and assurance. It supports four independent standard-setting boards, which establish international standards on ethics, auditing and assurance, accounting education, and public sector accounting. It also issues guidance to professional accountants in small and medium business accounting practices.

To ensure the activities of IFAC and the independent standard-setting bodies supported by IFAC are responsive to the public interest, an international Public Interest Oversight Board (PIOB) was established in February 2005 by the Monitoring Group, which was formed when it became apparent that governance reform of the International Federation of Accountants (IFAC) was needed.

IFAC is not an accreditation organization. Membership of IFAC is not obtained via an accreditation process, but instead, IFAC membership is obtained via an application process that must be sponsored by at least one current IFAC member organizations.

Among the key initiatives of IFAC is the organizing of the World Congress of Accountants.

== Standard-setting Boards ==
Old logo of IFAC

=== International Auditing and Assurance Standards Board ===
The International Auditing and Assurance Standards Board or IAASB is an independent standard-setting board that develops the International Standards on Auditing. IAASB issues International Standards on Auditing covering various services offered by professional accountants worldwide like auditing, review, other assurance, quality control, and related services.

The IAASB's objective, the scope of activities, and membership are set out in its Terms of Reference. The Public Interest Oversight Board oversees the work of the IAASB.

=== International Ethics Standards Board for Accountants ===
The International Ethics Standards Board for Accountants or IESBA develops a Code of Ethics for Professional Accountants to be followed by professional accountants throughout the world.

=== International Public Sector Accounting Standards Board ===
The International Public Sector Accounting Standards Board or IPSASB develops the International Public Sector Accounting Standards (IPSAS). These standards are based on the International Financial Reporting Standards (IFRSs) issued by the IASB with suitable modifications relevant for public sector accounting.

=== International Accounting Education Standards Board ===
The International Accounting Education Standards Board or IAESB develops uniform guidelines for education, training, and continuing professional development. National professional accounting organizations are required to consider these educational standards while formulating their educational systems.

== See also ==
- International Association for Accounting Education and Research
