= Accountant =

Practitioner of accounting or accountancy

Occupation
- Names: Certified Public Accountant (Accounts Officer), Chartered Certified Accountants, Chartered Accountant, Chartered Management Accountant, Cost and Management Accountants, Certified Management Accountants, etc.
- Occupation type: Profession
- Activity sectors: Business

Description
- Competencies: Corporate law, taxation, audit, finance, insolvency, management, mathematics, analytical skills and critical thinking skills
- Education required: In some countries bachelor's degree or master's degree is needed, see professional requirements
- Fields of employment: Private corporations, financial industry, government
- Related jobs: Bookkeeper

An accountant is a practitioner of accounting or accountancy. Accountants who have demonstrated competency through their professional associations' certification exams are certified to use titles such as Chartered Accountant, Chartered Certified Accountant or Certified Public Accountant, or Registered Public Accountant. Such professionals are granted certain responsibilities by statute, such as the ability to certify an organization's financial statements, and may be held liable for professional misconduct. Non-qualified accountants may be employed by a qualified accountant, or may work independently without statutory privileges and obligations.

Cahan & Sun (2015) used archival study to determine whether accountants' personal characteristics may exert a very significant impact during the audit process and further influence audit fees and audit quality. Practitioners have been portrayed in popular culture by the stereotype of the humorless, introspective bean-counter. It has been suggested that the stereotype has an influence on those attracted to the profession with many new entrants underestimating the importance of communication skills and overestimating the importance of numeracy in the role.

An accountant may either be hired for a firm that requires accounting services on a continuous basis, or may belong to an accounting firm that provides accounting consulting services to other firms. The Big Four auditors are the largest employers of accountants worldwide. However, most accountants are employed in commerce, industry, and the public sector.

== Commonwealth of Nations ==
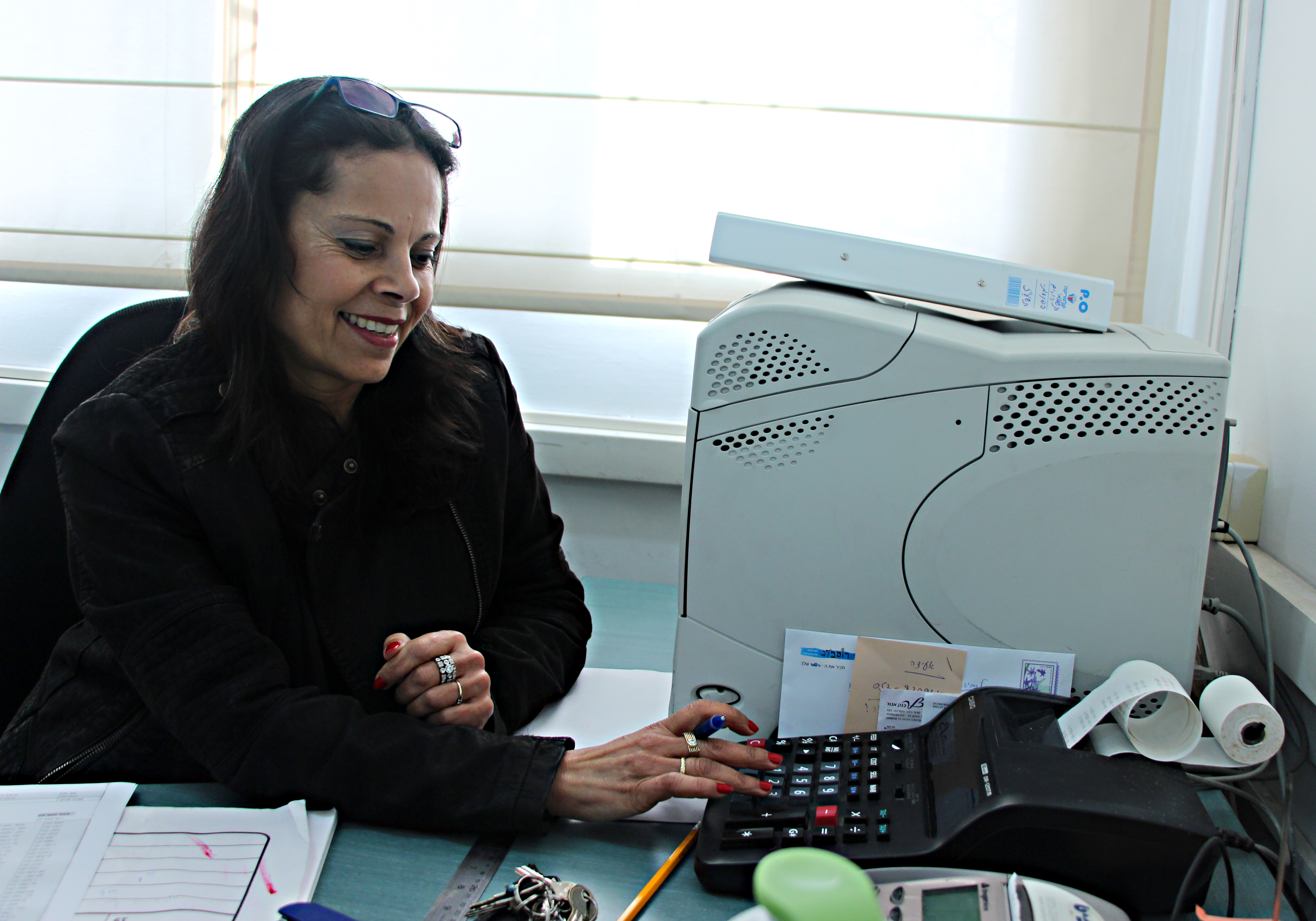
Accountant at work

In the Commonwealth of Nations, which include the United Kingdom, Canada, Australia, New Zealand, Hong Kong pre-1997, and several other states, commonly recognised accounting qualifications are Chartered Certified Accountant (ACCA), Chartered Accountant (CA or ACA), Certified Management Accountant (Institute of Certified Management Accountants) (CMA), Chartered Management Accountant (ACMA) and International Accountant (AAIA). Other qualifications in particular countries include Certified Public Accountant (CPA – Ireland and CPA – Hong Kong), Chartered Professional Accountant (CPA – Canada), Certified Management Accountant (Institute of Certified Management Accountants|CMA – Australia) (CMA – Sri Lanka), Certified Practising Accountant (CPA – Australia) and members of the Institute of Public Accountants (Australia), and Certified Public Practising Accountant (CPPA – New Zealand).

The Institute of Chartered Accountants of Scotland (ICAS) received its Royal Charter in 1854 and is the world's first professional body of accountants.

== United Kingdom and Ireland ==
Unlike a 'Chartered Accountant', the title 'accountant' does not require a specific qualification or licence in the UK, meaning anyone can call themselves an 'accountant'. HMRC's research suggests that one third of practising accountants do not belong to any professional body.

- A Chartered Accountant must be a member of one of the following:
  - the Institute of Chartered Accountants in England and Wales (ICAEW) (designatory letters ACA or FCA)
  - the Institute of Chartered Accountants of Scotland (ICAS) (designatory letters CA)
  - Chartered Accountants Ireland (CAI)
  - a recognised equivalent body from another Commonwealth country (designatory letters being CA (name of country) e.g. CA (Australia))
- A Chartered Certified Accountant must be a member of the Association of Chartered Certified Accountants (designatory letters ACCA or FCCA).
- A Chartered Management Accountant must be a member of the Chartered Institute of Management Accountants (designatory letters ACMA or FCMA).
- A Chartered Public Finance Accountant must be a member of the Chartered Institute of Public Finance and Accountancy (designatory letters CPFA).
- An International Accountant is a member of the Association of International Accountants (designatory letters AAIA or FAIA).
- An Incorporated Financial Accountant is a member of the Institute of Financial Accountants (designatory letters IFA, AFA or FFA).
- A Certified Public Accountant may be a member of the American Institute of Certified Public Accountants (designatory letters AICPA) or its equivalent in another country, and is usually designated as such after passing the Uniform Certified Public Accountant Examination. (designatory letters CPA)
- A Public Accountant may be a member of the Institute of Public Accountants (designatory letters AIPA, MIPA or FIPA).
- Registered Qualified Accountant may be a member of Accountants Institute (designatory letters RQA, and FQA for Fellow Members), based in Slovenia

Excepting the Association of Certified Public Accountants, each of the above bodies admits members only after passing examinations and undergoing a period of relevant work experience. Once admitted, members are expected to comply with ethical guidelines and gain appropriate professional experience.

Chartered, Chartered Certified, Chartered Public Finance, and International Accountants engaging in practice (i.e. selling services to the public rather than acting as an employee) must gain a "practising certificate" by satisfying a minimum period of post-qualifying experience and complying with wider obligations including adequate professional indemnity insurance, submitting annual compliance reports and agreeing to undergoing regular inspection.

The ICAEW, ICAS, ICAI, ACCA and AAPA are five Recognised Supervisory Bodies (RSB) in the UK. A member of one of them may also become a Statutory Auditor in accordance with the Companies Act, providing they can demonstrate the necessary professional ability in that area and submit to regular inspection. It is illegal for any individual or firm that is not a Statutory Auditor to perform a company audit.

The ICAEW, ICAS, ICAI, ACCA, AIA and CIPFA are six recognised qualifying bodies statutory (RQB) in the UK. A member of one of them may also become a Statutory Auditor in accordance with the Companies Act, providing they are a member of one of the five Recognised Supervisory Bodies RSB mentioned above.

All six RQBs are listed under EU mutual recognition directives to practise in 27 EU member states and individually entered into agreement with the Hong Kong Institute of Certified Public Accountants (HKICPA).

Further restrictions apply to accountants who carry out insolvency work.

In addition to the bodies above, technical qualifications are offered by the Association of Accounting Technicians, ACCA and AIA, which are respectively called AAT Technician, CAT (Certified Accounting Technician) and IAT (International Accounting Technician).

== United States ==
In the United States, licensed accountants are Certified Public Accountants (CPAs), and in certain states, Public Accountants (PAs). Unlicensed accountants may be Certified Internal Auditors (CIAs) and Certified Management Accountants (CMAs). The difference between these certifications is primarily the legal status and the types of services provided, although individuals may earn more than one certification. Additionally, much accounting work is performed by uncertified individuals, who may be working under the supervision of a certified accountant. As noted above, the majority of accountants work in the private sector or may offer their services without the need for certification.

The training time required for accountancy certification in the US requires specific guidelines:

- Certificate: Several months to a year
- Associate degree: One–two years
- Bachelor's degree: Three–four years
- CPA: Five years of education (150 semester college credits) plus one–two years of work experience (length of work experience requirement depends on which state is granting the license)
- Master's degree: One–two years
- Doctoral degree: Three–five years

In recent years, the profession in the U.S. has experienced a structural talent deficit driven by a declining CPA exam pipeline, retiring professionals, and the demanding 150-hour academic requirement.

A CPA is licensed by a state to provide auditing services to the public. Many CPA firms also offer accounting, tax, litigation support, and other financial advisory services. The requirements for receiving the CPA license vary from state to state, although the passage of the Uniform Certified Public Accountant Examination is required by all states. This examination is designed and graded by the American Institute of Certified Public Accountants (AICPA).

A PA (sometimes referred to as LPA—Licensed Public Accountant) is licensed by the state to practice accountancy to the same extent as are CPAs, although in some states PAs are not permitted to perform audits or reviews (notably Iowa, Minnesota, Oregon, & South Carolina). A PA's ability to practice out of state is very limited due to most states having phased out the PA designation. While most states no longer accept new PA license applicants, four states still accept PA applicants for practice privileges within the state. As with the CPA, the requirements for receiving the PA license vary from state to state. Most states require a passage of either two or three (out of four) sections of the CPA exam or passage of the Comprehensive Examination for Accreditation in Accounting which is administered and graded by the Accreditation Council for Accountancy and Taxation (ACAT).

A certified internal auditor (CIA) is granted a certificate from the Institute of Internal Auditors (IIA), provided that the candidate has passed a four-part examination. One of the four parts is waived if the candidate has already passed the CPA Exam. A CIA typically provides services directly to an employer rather than to the public.

A person holding the Certificate in Management Accounting (CMA) is granted the certificate by the Institute of Management Accountants (IMA), provided that the candidate has passed an examination of two parts and has met the practical experience requirement of the IMA. A CMA provides services directly to employers rather than to the public. A CMA can also provide services to the public, but to an extent much lesser than that of a CPA.

An Enrolled Agent (EA) is a federally authorized tax practitioner empowered by the U.S. Department of the Treasury to represent taxpayers before the Internal Revenue Service (IRS). Enrolled agent status is the highest credential awarded by the IRS, unlimited rights of representation. The EA credential is recognized across all 50 U.S. states. Candidates must pass a three-part exam (called the Special Enrollment Examination) covering the subjects of individual tax, business tax, and client representation, or must have worked at the IRS for five consecutive years in a position which regularly engaged in these areas.

The United States Department of Labor's Bureau of Labor Statistics estimates that there are about one million persons employed as accountants and auditors in the U.S.

U.S. tax laws grant CPAs and EAs a form of accountant–client privilege.

== Australia ==
In Australia, there are three legally recognised local professional accounting bodies which all enjoy the same recognition and can be considered as "qualified accountant": the Institute of Public Accountants (IPA), CPA Australia (CPA) and the Chartered Accountants Australia and New Zealand (CAANZ). Other international bodies such as ACCA (The Association of Chartered Certified Accountants) and Institute of Chartered Accountants in England and Wales (ICAEW) enjoy recognition for the purposes of supporting their members in their careers. For instance, ACCA has achieved recognition by the Tax Practitioner Board, as Tax and BAS agents, in 2010.

== Canada ==
In Canada, a Chartered Professional Accountant (CPA) must be a member of the Chartered Professional Accountants of Canada (designatory letters CPA).

Up to 2013, there were three nationally recognized accounting designations in Canada: Chartered Accountant (CA), Certified General Accountant (CGA), and Certified Management Accountants (CMA). The national CA and CGA bodies were created by Acts of Parliament in 1902 and 1913 respectively, The national CMA organization was established under the Canada Corporations Act in 1920.

In January 2012, following eight months of member and stakeholder consultation, the Canadian Institute of Chartered Accountants (CICA), the Society of Management Accountants of Canada (CMA Canada) and Certified General Accountants of Canada (CGA-Canada) issued A Framework for Uniting the Canadian Accounting Profession under a new Canadian Chartered Professional Accountant (CPA) designation. Chartered Professional Accountants of Canada (CPA Canada) was established by CICA and CMA Canada on January 1, 2013, under the Canada Not-for-profit Corporations Act, to support Canadian provincial accounting bodies that were unifying under the CPA banner. CGA-Canada integrated with CPA Canada on October 1, 2014, completing the unification of Canada's accounting profession at the national level.

All recognized national and provincial accounting bodies in Canada have now unified under the CPA banner. The Canadian CPA designation is held by more than 200,000 members in Canada and around the world.

== Japan ==
In Japan, a certified public accountant must be a member of the Japanese Institute of Certified Public Accountants (JICPA). It is the sole professional accountancy organization in Japan.

== India ==
Chartered accountancy is offered in India by the Institute of Chartered Accountants of India (ICAI), the second largest accounting body in the world. This Institute was established in 1949 under the Chartered Accountants Act, 1949 for the regulation of the profession of chartered accountants in India.

The ICAI set up the Accountancy Museum of India in 2009, the third museum of accounting in the world. It is located at ICAI's office in Noida.A Cost and Management Accountant is registered as a member under the Institute of Cost Accountants of India(ICMAI) previously known as (ICWAI) which is a statutory body constituted under the Cost and Works Accountants Act 1959 enacted by the Parliament of India, it is also the second largest Management Accountancy body in the world. The members of the Institute are widely recognized as Cost and Management Accountants (FCMA, ACMA).

== Indonesia ==
Under Public Accountants Law ( UU 5/2011), the Institute of Certified Public Accountants of Indonesia (IAPI) is the professional organization having the authority to issue CPA designation which is the statutory requirements for obtaining public accountant license from the government.

== Pakistan ==
The Institute of Chartered Accountants of Pakistan (ICAP) offers chartered accountant studies in Pakistan. ICAP was established under The Chartered Accountants Ordinance, 1961 as a self-regulatory body.

The Institute of Cost and Management Accountants of Pakistan (ICMAP) offers accountant studies in Pakistan. ICMAP was established under The Cost and Management Accountants Act, 1966.

Pakistan Institute of Public Finance Accountants (PIPFA) is an autonomous body recognized mainly in the government sector and established under license from the Securities and Exchange Commission of Pakistan by the authority given under section 42 of the Companies Ordinance, 1984.

The body is co-sponsored by the Institute of Chartered Accountants of Pakistan, the Institute of Cost and Management Accountants of Pakistan and the Auditor General of Pakistan.PIPFA has more than 5,000 members and a number of them are members of ICAP and ICMAP.

The institute was established to produce a second tier of accounting professionals in Pakistan

== Bangladesh ==
Chartered accountancy is governed in Bangladesh by the Institute of Chartered Accountants of Bangladesh (ICAB).

== New Zealand ==
In New Zealand, there are two local accountancy bodies the Chartered Accountants Australia and New Zealand (CAANZ) and the New Zealand Association of Certified Public Accountants (NZACPA) the operating name of New Zealand Association of Accountants Inc (NZAA).

To audit public companies an individual must be a member of either the CAANZ or an otherwise gazetted body. Chartered Certified Accountant (Association of Chartered Certified Accountants or FCCA) qualification has also been gazetted under. An ACCA member can practice as long as they hold an ACCA public practice certificate (with audit qualification) in their country of origin.

== Singapore ==
In Singapore, a public accountant must be a member of any professional accountancy body in Singapore. Institute of Singapore Chartered Accountants (ISCA) is the sole local accountancy body, therefore the public accountant must be a member of the ISCA.

== Sri Lanka ==
In Sri Lanka, a chartered accountant must be a member of the Institute of Chartered Accountants of Sri Lanka (designatory letters ACA or FCA). It is the sole local accountancy body, therefore to audit public companies an individual must be a member of the ICASL. A Certified management account also must be a member of the Institute of Management Accountants of Sri Lanka (designatory letters ACMA or FCMA).

== Austria ==
In Austria, the accountancy profession is regulated by the Bilanzbuchhaltungsgesetz 2014 (BibuG – Management Accountancy Law).

== Hong Kong ==
In Hong Kong, the accountancy industry is regulated by Hong Kong Institute of Certified Public Accountants(HKICPA) under the Professional Accountants Ordinance (Chapter 50, Laws of Hong Kong). The auditing industry for limited companies is regulated under the Companies Ordinance (Chapter 32, Laws of Hong Kong), and other ordinances such as the securities and futures ordinance, the listing rules, etc.

HKICPA terminated all recognition of overshare bodies in 2005 for accreditation under professional accountants ordinance. In general, all British RQBs except for CIPFA were re-accredited. Please refer to HKICPA for latest recognition.

== Portugal ==
In Portugal, there are two accountancy qualifications: the Contabilistas Certificados (CC), responsible for producing accounting and tax information, and the Revisor Oficial de Contas (ROC), more related to auditing practices. The CC certification is exclusively awarded by the professional organization Ordem dos Contabilistas Certificados (OCC), and the certification to become an auditor is awarded by another professional organization, the Ordem dos Revisores Oficiais de Contas (OROC). In general, accountants or auditors accredited by OTOC or OROC are individuals with university graduation diplomas in business management, economics, mathematics or law who, after further studies, applied for an exam and received the certification to be a CC or ROC. That certification is only received after a one-year (CC) or three-year (ROC) internship. Any citizen having a polytechnic degree as a bookkeeper is also entitled to apply for the exam and certification at the OCC.

== See also ==
- Bookkeeper
- Credit manager
- Journal entries
