= Australian Accounting Standards Board =

Government body overseeing Australian accounting standards

Government agency overview
- Formed: 1991
- Preceding Government agency: Public Sector Accounting Standards Board
- Superseding Government agency: Accounting Standards Review Board
- Jurisdiction: Commonwealth of Australia
- Minister responsible: Jim Chalmers, Treasury Portfolio
- Parent department: Department of the Treasury (Australia)
- Key document: Australian Securities and Investments Commission Act 2001
- Website: aasb.gov.au

The Australian Accounting Standards Board (AASB) is an Australian Government agency that develops and maintains financial reporting standards applicable to entities in the private and public sectors of the Australian economy. Also, the AASB contributes to the development of global financial reporting standards and facilitates the participation of the Australian community in global standard setting. The AASB's functions and powers are set out in the Australian Securities and Investments Commission Act 2001. The AASB uses a conceptual framework to develop and evaluate accounting standards.

== Overview of standards ==
The AASB makes Australian Accounting Standards, including Interpretations, to be applied by:

(a) entities required by the Corporations Act 2001 to prepare financial reports;
(b) governments in preparing financial statements for the whole of government and the General Government Sector (GGS); and
(c) entities in the private or public for-profit or not-for-profit sectors that are reporting entities or that prepare general purpose financial statements.

AASB 1053 Application of Tiers of Australian Accounting Standards establishes a differential reporting framework consisting of two tiers of reporting requirements for preparing general purpose financial statements:

(a) Tier 1: Australian Accounting Standards; and
(b) Tier 2: Australian Accounting Standards – Reduced Disclosure Requirements.

=== Application ===
Tier 1 requirements incorporate International Financial Reporting Standards (IFRSs), including Interpretations, issued by the International Accounting Standards Board (IASB), with the addition of paragraphs on the applicability of each Standard in the Australian environment.

Publicly accountable (defined in AASB 1053) for-profit private sector entities are required to adopt Tier 1 requirements, and therefore are required to comply with IFRSs. Furthermore, other for-profit private sector entities complying with Tier 1 requirements will simultaneously comply with IFRSs. Some other entities complying with Tier 1 requirements will also simultaneously comply with IFRSs.

Tier 2 requirements comprise the recognition, measurement and presentation requirements of Tier 1 but substantially reduced disclosure requirements in comparison with Tier 1.

=== Interaction with other standards ===
Australian Accounting Standards also include requirements that are specific to Australian entities. These requirements may be located in Australian Accounting Standards that incorporate IFRSs or in other Australian Accounting Standards. In most instances, these requirements are either restricted to the not-for-profit or public sectors or include additional disclosures that address domestic, regulatory or other issues. These requirements do not prevent publicly accountable for-profit private sector entities from complying with IFRSs. In developing requirements for public sector entities, the AASB considers the requirements of International Public Sector Accounting Standards (IPSASs), as issued by the International Public Sector Accounting Standards Board (IPSASB) of the International Federation of Accountants.

== Standard application ==
The original series of Australian Accounting Standards (AASs), which was applicable to entities not regulated under the Corporations Law, was issued by the former AASB and the Public Sector Accounting Standards Board (PSASB) of the Australian Accounting Research Foundation (AARF) on behalf of the professional accounting bodies, prior to 2000. The original series of AASB Standards (AASBs), which was applicable to entities regulated under the Corporations Law, was also issued by the former AASB, prior to 2000. Most AASs were superseded by AASBs for reporting periods beginning on or after 1 January 2005 – as at 1 July 2011, only AAS 25 Financial Reporting by Superannuation Plans was still operative. All standards now issued by the AASB are labelled AASB Accounting Standards – their application paragraphs specify the types of entities to which they apply.

Under the Australian Corporations Act 2001, many entities are required to apply Australian Accounting Standards when preparing their financial statements. Some public sector entities are required to apply Australian Accounting Standards under either Commonwealth, state or territory legislation, through specific instructions to preparers or reporting frameworks that set out guidelines or regulations.

Members of Institute of Chartered Accountants in Australia, CPA Australia, and the Institute of Public Accountants have a professional obligation to take all reasonable steps within their power to ensure that entities with which they are involved comply with Australian Accounting Standards when preparing their general purpose financial statements.

== Adopted standards ==
Since 2002, the AASB implemented the broad strategic direction from the Australian Financial Reporting Council (FRC) to adopt International Accounting Standards Board (IASB) standards for financial reporting periods beginning on or after 1 January 2005. In July 2004, the AASB issued a number of standards that apply from 2005, including:

- Australian Accounting Standards that incorporate IASB Standards
- Other AASB Standards supporting the Australian Accounting Standards that incorporate IASB Standards
- Other AASB Standards that apply to certain types of entities

The Australian Accounting Standards that incorporate IASB Standards include:

- AASB 1 First-time Adoption of Australian Accounting Standards, AASB 2 Share-based Payment, etc., which incorporate IFRS 1 First-time Adoption of International Financial Reporting Standards, IFRS 2 Share-based Payment, etc., being the Standards issued by the IASB since 2001
- AASB 101 Presentation of Financial Statements, AASB 102 Inventories, etc., which incorporate IAS 1 Presentation of Financial Statements, IAS 2 Inventories, etc., being the Standards issued by the International Accounting Standards Committee (IASC), which was the predecessor to the IASB

For reporting periods beginning on or after 1 January 2005, the Australian Accounting Standards that incorporate IASB Standards supersede their previous Australian counterparts, if any.

The other AASB Standards supplementing the Australian Accounting Standards that incorporate IASB Standards comprise:

- AASB 1023 General Insurance Contracts
- AASB 1031 Materiality
- AASB 1038 Life Insurance Contracts
- AASB 1048 Interpretation and Application of Standards
- AASB 1053 Application of Tiers of Australian Accounting Standards
- AASB 1054 Australian Additional Disclosures

Current Australian Accounting Standards for which there are no corresponding IASB Standards remain in force beyond 1 January 2005, even though they may be reissued in the future to update them in this new regime. These include:

- AAS 25 Financial Reporting by Superannuation Plans
- AASB 1004 Contributions, AASB 1039 Concise Financial Reports, AASB 1049 Whole of Government and General Government Sector Financial Reporting, AASB 1050 Administered Items, AASB 1051 Land Under Roads and AASB 1052 Disaggregated Disclosures

== See also ==
- Accounting Professional & Ethical Standards Board
- List of accountancy bodies
- List of Australian Commonwealth Government entities
- Margin on Services
