= Confederation of Asian and Pacific Accountants =

- Abbreviation: CAPA
- Type: Not-for-profit organisation
- Region served: Asia-Pacific
- President: Chen Yugui
- Website: www.capa.com.my

The Confederation of Asian and Pacific Accountants (CAPA) is a regional organization representing 33 national professional accountancy organizations (PAOs) operating in Asia and the Pacific. These PAOs, referred to as CAPA’s members, represent close to 2 million accountants across the region.

== History ==
Governor Gregorio S. Licaros, President of the Philippine Institute of Certified Public Accountants, came up with the idea for the CAPA. The first Far East Conference of Accountants was held between November 28 and December 1 of 1957 in Manila, Philippines. The event, said to be the forerunner of CAPA, "created history in the accountancy world as it became the base for various professional accounting bodies in the Far East to confer every few years to discuss and exchange information."

Fourteen countries sent delegates to the first event. Of these fourteen, twelve would go on to be considered the founding members of CAPA.

1. Australia
2. Hong Kong
3. India
4. Indonesia
5. Japan
6. Korea
7. Malaysia
8. New Zealand
9. Pakistan
10. Taiwan
11. Thailand
12. Philippines

The delegates from the other two countries, England and Netherlands, were sent only as observers.

A second conference was held between March 31 and April 2 of 1960, where Ceylon, Singapore, and the United States of America joined. In order "to reflect the extended membership, the description of the grouping was changed from the 'Far East Conference of Accountants' to the 'Confederation of Asian and Pacific Accountants' (CAPA)." During the 8th CAPA Conference, the CAPA adopted a formal charter, established an Executive Committee and elected its first President, " Gordon M. Macwhinnie.

== Past Presidents ==
Name	Jurisdiction	Term length
Gordon M. Macwhinnie	Hong Kong	September 1976 – October 1979
Eduardo M. Villanueva	Philippines	October 1979 – November 1983
Niladri K. Bose *	India	November 1983 – May 1985
John O. Miller	Australia	May 1985 – November 1986
Hiroshi Kawakita	Japan	November 1986 – May 1988
Rex A. Anderson	New Zealand	May 1988 – September 1989
Taesik Suh	Korea R.O.	September 1989 – October 1991
William Mercer	Canada	October 1991 – September 1993
Douglas C. Oxley	Hong Kong	September 1993 – April 1995
Soon Kwai Choy	Malaysia	April 1995 – October 1996
Robert J.C. Jeffery	Australia	October 1996 – October 1998
Carlos R. Alindada	Philippines	October 1998 – November 2000
Ranel T. Wijesinha	Sri Lanka	November 2000 – April 2002
Li Yong	China P.R.	April 2002 – October 2003
Robin Hamilton Harding	Canada	October 2003 – November 2005
Shozo Yamazaki	Japan	November 2005 – October 2007
Kamlesh S. Vikamsey	India	October 2007 – October 2009
In-Ki Joo	Korea R.O.	October 2009 – September 2011
Keith Wedlock	New Zealand	September 2011 – November 2013
Sujeewa Mudalige	Sri Lanka	November 2013 – October 2015
Jackie Poirier	Canada	October 2015 - November 2017
Manoj Fadnis	India	November 2017 - November 2019

== Current Board Members ==
President: Chen Yugui (China)

Chief Executive: Brian Blood

BOARD MEMBER	DIRECTOR
Australia	Priya Terumalay
Bangladesh	Nasir U. Ahmed
Canada	Nancy Foran
China P.R.	Shu Huihao
India	Prafulla Chhajed
Japan	Satsuki Miyahara
Korea R.O.	Yong-Sok Jhun
Nepal	Suvod K. Karn
New Zealand	Gill Cox
Pakistan	Jafar Husain
Sri Lanka	Sanjaya Bandara
United States of America (Deputy President)	Jim Knafo

== Membership ==
JURISDICTION	MEMBER
Australia	CPA Australia (CPA Australia) www.cpaaustralia.com.au Institute of Public Accountants (IPA) www.publicaccountants.org.au
Australia & New Zealand	Chartered Accountants Australia and New Zealand www.charteredaccountantsanz.com
Bangladesh	Institute of Chartered Accountants of Bangladesh www.icab.org.bd Institute of Cost and Management Accountants of Bangladesh www.icmab.org
Canada	CPA Canada www.cpacanada.ca
China, People’s Republic of	Chinese Institute of Certified Public Accountants (CICPA) www.cicpa.org.cn
Fiji	Fiji Institute of Accountants (FIA) www.fia.org.fj
India	Institute of Chartered Accountants of India (ICAI) www.icai.org Institute of Cost Accountants of India www.icmai.in
Japan	Japanese Institute of Certified Public Accountants (JICPA) www.jicpa.or.jp
Republic of Korea	Korean Institute of Certified Public Accountants (KICPA) www.kicpa.or.kr
Mongolia	Mongolian Institute of Certified Public Accountants (MonICPA) www.monicpa.mn
Nepal	Institute of Chartered Accountants of Nepal www.ican.org.np
Pakistan	Institute of Chartered Accountants of Pakistan www.icap.org.pk Institute of Cost & Management Accountants of Pakistan (ICMAP) www.icmap.com.pk
Papua New Guinea	Certified Practising Accountants of Papua New Guinea (CPAPNG) www.cpapng.org.pg
Philippines	Philippine Institute of Certified Public Accountants (PICPA) www.picpa.com.ph
Samoa	Samoa Institute of Accountants (SIA) www.sia.org.ws
Sri Lanka	Institute of Chartered Accountants of Sri Lanka www.casrilanka.com Association of Accounting Technicians of Sri Lanka (AATSL) www.aatsl.lk Institute of Certified Management Accountants of Sri Lanka (CMASL) www.cma-srilanka.org
United States of America	American Institute of Certified Public Accountants (AICPA) www.aicpa.org Institute of Management Accountants imanet.org
Vietnam	Vietnam Association of Certified Public Accountants (VACPA) www.vacpa.org.vn
JURISDICTION	ASSOCIATE
Afghanistan	Certified Professional Accountants of Afghanistan (CPA Afghanistan)
D.P.R. Korea	Pyongyang Office of Auditors of the D.P.R. of Korea (POA)
Samara, Russian Federation	National Institute of Professional Accountants, Financial Managers and Economists (NIPA)
Solomon Islands	Institute of Solomon Islands Accountants (ISIA)
JURISDICTION	AFFILIATE
France	Delegation Internationale pour l’Audit et la Comptabilite www.dipacint.com Representing: Compagnie Nationale des Commissaires aux Comptes (CNCC) www.cncc.fr Conseil Superieur de l’Ordre des Experts-Comptables (CSOEC) www.experts-comptables.com
United Kingdom	ACCA (Association of Chartered Certified Accountants) www.accaglobal.com Association of Accounting Technicians (AAT) www.aat.org.uk Chartered Institute of Public Finance and Accountancy (CIPFA) www.cipfa.org ICAEW (Institute of Chartered Accountants in England and Wales) www.icaew.com
