= Institute of Certified Management Accountants of Sri Lanka =

Sri Lankan professional body

Institute of Certified Management Accountants of Sri Lanka.
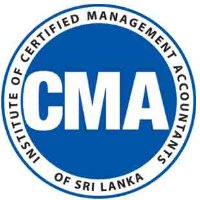
- Abbreviation: CMA Sri Lanka
- Predecessor: Society of Certified Management Accountants of Sri Lanka.
- Formation: June 3, 2000; 26 years ago
- Legal status: Body corporate established by a special act Act No. 23 of 2009 of the Parliament of Sri Lanka on April 20, 2009; 17 years ago
- Headquarters: Colombo, Sri Lanka
- Region served: Sri Lanka
- Members: Over 2,400
- Official language: English, Sinhala and Tamil.
- Website: www.cma-srilanka.org

The Institute of Certified Management Accountants of Sri Lanka, (CMA Sri Lanka) is a professional body offering qualification in management accountancy in Sri Lanka.

It mainly focuses of development and promoting the study of Management Accountancy, establishing management accountancy standards, and promote the profession of management accountancy in Sri Lanka.

== History ==
The institute was initially established as "Society of Certified Management Accountants of Sri Lanka", on 3 June 2000 in Colombo Sri Lanka with the help technical assistance and the guidelines of Certified of Management Accountants of Canada (CMA Canada), now CPA Canada and the Institute of Management Accountants (IMA) of USA and International Federation of Accountants (IFAC) which is the global organization for the accountancy profession.

Initially, the Canadian International Development Agency (CIDA) was funded the formulating of the new educational syllabus, preparation of study material, and other related inauguration works. The CMA Sri Lanka received the help of CMA Canada in the preparation of its first educational syllabus, study material and examination works in order to comply with the international standards.

== International Associations Recognition ==
CMA Sri Lanka now a full member of the International Federation of Accountants (IFAC) since 2014. The IFAC is a global organization for the accountancy profession.

The institute, received the membership of other regional accountancy bodies such as the confederation of Asian and Pacific Accountants (CAPA). Member of the South Asian Federation of Accountants (SAFA). and Toastmasters International.

== Examination structure ==
The institution has 4 levels of examination and an integrative case study: Foundation, Operational, Managerial, and Strategic.

The examination syllabus change in every 5 years to meet the industry standards. The first two levels available in English, Sinhala, and Tamil languages (medium), and the final two levels only available in English medium. All the levels can be completed in a 2.5 year period of time. Examinations are held twice annually, in May and November.

The current examination syllabus consists of 17 core course units, 4 skill course units, and a final integrative Case Study. After completing all the 17 core courses and 4 skills course candidates can sit for the final case study. The minimum pass mark per subject is 50.

The current examination covers the Management Accounting, Financial Accounting, Financial Management, Strategic Management Accounting, Personal and Corporate Taxation, Business law and Corporate law, Auditing, Information Technology, Marketing & Human Resource Management, Strategic Management, Business English, etc.

== Global partnerships ==
Through partnerships with the international professional institutions, CMA Sri Lanka passed finalist and members who followed without getting exemptions for the CMA examination subjects can obtain other related professional qualifications.

- Association of Chartered Certified Accountants - ACCA (UK) awards F1 to F9 subjects exemptions.
- Chartered Institute of Management Accountants – CIMA (UK) awarded Foundation Level and Operational Level exemptions.
- Institute of Financial Accountants – IFA (UK) awards Technician, Associate and Fellow level papers exemptions.
- CPA Australia - offer to get an associate membership.
- Certified General Accountants of Ontario – CGA Canada offered maximum of 12 subjects exemptions.

== University Links ==
The CMA Sri Lanka passed finalist can obtain the benefits of the following qualification:

- Open University of Sri Lanka offers Bachelor of Management Studies (BMS). Can register in the level 5 and need to select a specialization area subject at the 6th level.
- Postgraduate Institute of Management (PIM) Sri Lanka (Affiliated to University of Sri Jayewardenepura) - CMA Passed Finalists are eligible to register for the Masters in Business Administration (MBA) degree.
- Deakin University – Melbourne, Australia offers 10 credit points exemptions.

== Legal recognition ==
The qualified members have been approved to register as Company Secretaries under the Companies act No. 7 of 2017 of Sri Lanka. (gazette extraordinary no. 1998/11 dated 20-12-2016 prepared under the article 527 of Companies Act no. 07 of 2007,)

Moreover, the CMA Sri Lanka's qualifications now use in recruitment to the Sri Lankan government services including the Sri Lanka Accounting Service, Sri Lanka Audit Service, Government corporations, state-owned businesses, semi-state own companies, and state banks.

The students who have completed up to the Managerial Level (Level 03) with 10 years proven accounting experience can apply for Tax Authorized Representative qualifications under the Inland Revenue Act, No. 10 of 2006 of Sri Lanka. Act special gazette pdf file.

== Membership ==
CMA Sri Lanka has two grades of full membership and a part qualification designations. For full membership:

- ACMA - Associate Members of the Certified Management Accountant of Sri Lanka.
- FCMA - Fellow Members of the Certified Management Accountant of Sri Lanka.

To become an ACMA every passed finalist student should cover the 3 years compulsory practical training requirement, case study examination, and a viva voice examination. The every trainee should maintain a training document and certify it by the CMA Sri Lanka approved witness (A qualified Accountant). After gaining the ACMA qualifications and completing the 5 years working professional experience including 3 years of senior managerial level with the 120 hours of the continuing professional development (CPD) requirement can obtain the FCMA designation.

For Part Qualification membership:

- AMA - Associate Management Accountant of Sri Lanka.

The institute offers AMA part qualifications for the students who have completed up to the Managerial Level (3rd level) examinations and cover the two years of practical training requirement.

== Strategic Alliances ==
The Institute of Certified Management of Sri Lanka enjoys MOU agreements with:

- Association of Chartered Certified Accountants (ACCA). (Exempt ACCA F1 to F9 papers for CMA passed finalist students & members who set the CMA relevant papers)
- CPA Australia.
- Chartered Institute of Management Accountants – CIMA (UK).
- Institute of Financial Accountants – IFA(UK).
- AIMA India.
- CMA Canada now CPA Canada.
- ICMA Bangladesh.
- ICMA Pakistan.
- ICWA India now ICAI India.
- Malaysian Institute of Accountants (MIA).
- Deakin University in Australia,
- Open University of Sri Lanka.
- University of Sri Jayawardenepura in Sri Lanka.
- University of Colombo in Sri Lanka.
- University of Kelaniya in Sri Lanka.
- Gujarat Forensic Sciences University in India.

And several other leading international accountancy bodies and universities.

== See also ==
- Accounting in Sri Lanka
- Association of Accounting Technicians of Sri Lanka
- Institute of Chartered Accountants of Sri Lanka
