= Employers Mutual Limited =

Australian insurance company

EML Group
- Type: Insurance
- Industry: Insurance Carriers; Offices of Holding Companies
- Founded: 1910
- Headquarters: Level 3/ 345 George Street, Sydney, Australia
- Number of employees: over 3,500
- Website: www.eml.com.au

EML Group is one of the oldest Australian personal injury insurers with history dating back to 1910. The service range of this company is only in Australia, with over 3,500 specialists operating in New South Wales, South Australia and Victoria. The head office of this company is in Sydney. Other branches are distributed in Brisbane in Queensland, Parramatta, Newcastle, Tweed and Gosford in New South Wales, and a South Australian branch in Adelaide.

EML is an appointed personal injury claims manager for organisations both government and private sector such as icare insurance for NSW, WorkSafe Victoria and ReturnToWorkSA. It provides workers compensation, self-insurance, government claims operations, life Insurance managements, consultancy services and other specialist insurance services. The EML Group consists of a group of companies and brands such as Hospitality Industry Insurance Ltd, a specialised workers compensation insurer for the hospitality industry in NSW and Trinity Insurance, a specialised workers compensation insurance provider for the Roman Catholic Church and in its religious institutions in NSW.

== History ==
=== 1910–1926 ===
EML is a combination of three associations which are formed in the early 20th century.

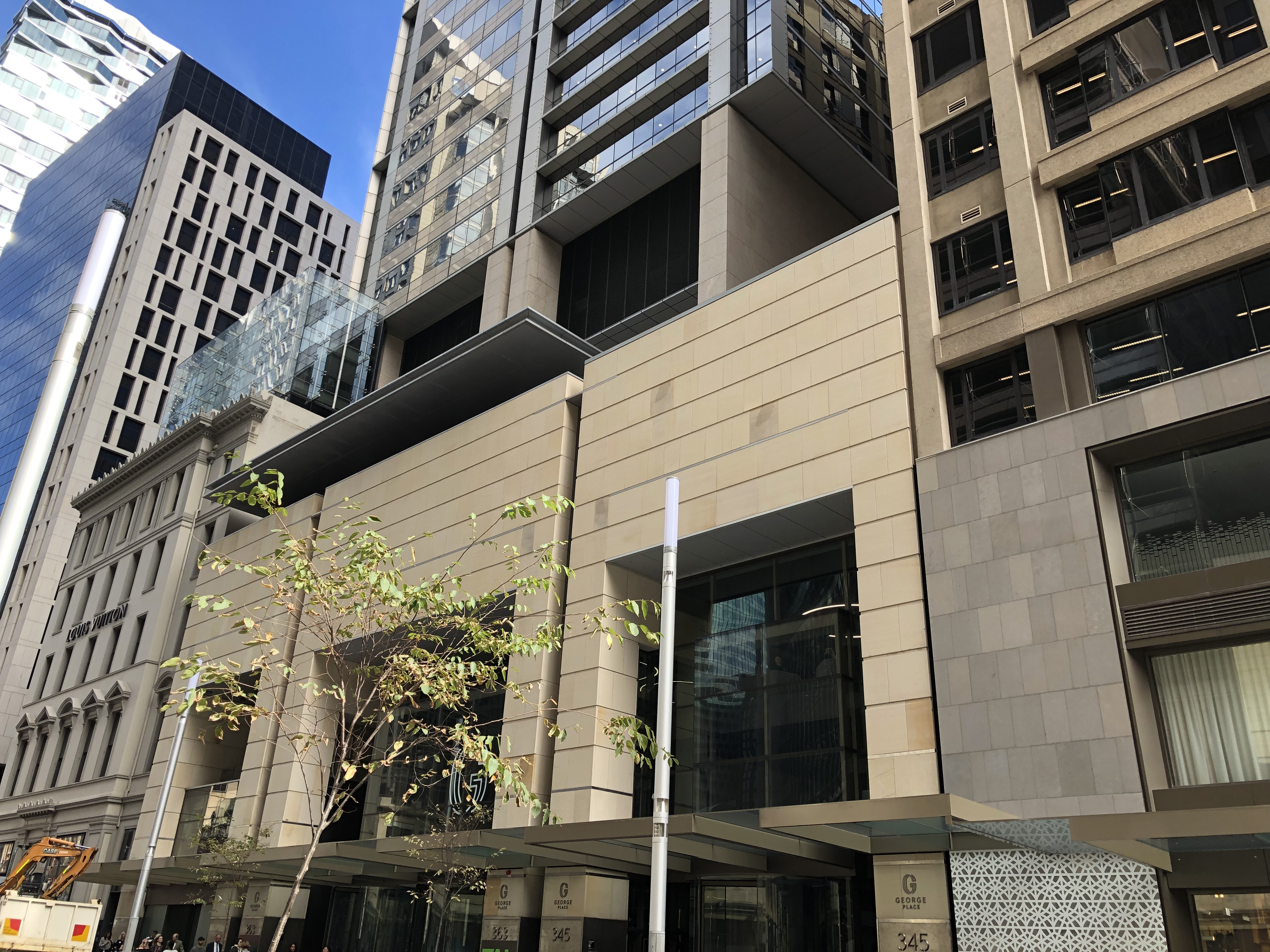
EML in Sydney, Australia

Master Bakers Association is a prospered bread company which established in 1881. On the celebration of the third anniversary of the formation of this company, managers of this company started to realise the importance of workers' rights and living standard. Great Southern Bakeries is one of the large baking business in the early 20th century in Australia. After realising that the requirement of providing compensation to workers who get injured while working, Great Southern Bakeries and the Master Bakers Association set up the Master Baker's Mutual Indemnity Association Ltd, which was registered in Sydney, New South Wales as a limited company in 1910. According to EML (2019), with five employees, the Master Bakers Association provides compensation services to workers in baking, plumbing and transport industries in New South Wales at that time. This organisation established the first compensation act which affects the state at that time. In 1911, the Master Bakers' Mutual Indemnity Association Ltd guaranteed to protect workers' right by assisting individuals to against claim and demands in respect of accidents to workers

This concept of insurance and compensation gradually separated into other industries at that time. Limited by guarantee, the Plumbers' Mutual Indemnity Association was registered in 1912 with the core service of resulting in injury to employees and help workers to reduce their losses when get injured from work. The head office of the Plumbers' Mutual Indemnity Association was set in Sydney. The Master Carriers' Mutual Indemnity Association was established in 1914.

In June 1926, a subjoined special resolution was passed by the Master Plumbers' Mutual Indemnity Association, as their asset might be handed over to the Master Carriers' Mutual Indemnity Association, and in return Master Carriers' Mutual Indemnity Association will accept membership from the Master Plumbers' Mutual Indemnity Association. Together with the Master Baker's Mutual Indemnity Association Ltd, these three association that has been acting independently but in similar lines for several years merged to become the Employers Mutual Limited in 1926, which is a combination of interest of this three large workers' compensation company. At that time, Employers Mutual Limited was estimated to own an initial membership of 500 to 600 in total, and approximately £40,000 revenue in the first year.

=== 1987–2003 ===
After Employers Mutual Limited was established, the company enlarged and expanded its business throughout the following decades. In 1987, the company became an agent of the WorkerCover( now named icare workers insurance) in New South Wales, with a license to manage workers compensation claims.

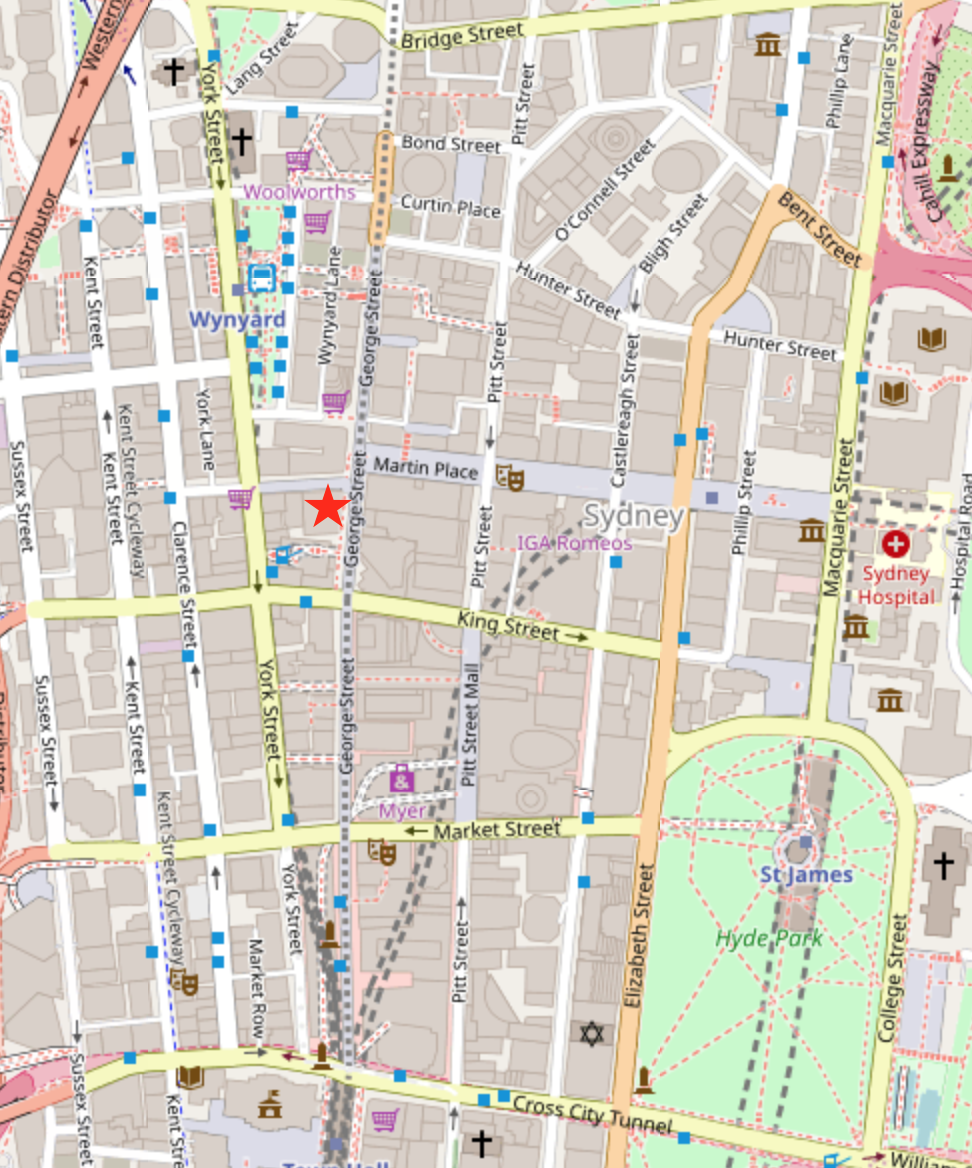
The location of Employers Mutual Limited in Sydney

Aiming at providing workplace compensation and health insurance to mining workers, Employers Mutual Limited established Coal Services Pty Limited in 2001. By establishing this organisation, the company expands its services into the Coal mining industry in New South Wales. Two years later, EML announced that it handles the coal mining insurance industry scheme and be responsible for the public liability for association scheme.

=== 2005–2008 ===
The number of the employees in Employers Mutual Limited increased to 240 and the company was appointed to manage the New South Wales Treasury Managed Fund (TMF) for government employees in 2005. TMF refers to "Treasury Managed Fund", which is created by the NSW government to reduce the NSW agency operation risk. TMF not only covers big insurance service program such as insurance of NSW icons but also covers daily incidents such as workers compensation, general lines, and travel protection services. As one of the service providers for icare, Employed Mutual Limited provides compensation service and other specialist support including Ministry of Health (South), Police and Emergency Services, Planning and Premier and Cabinet for government departments employees and workers who get injured from work.

In 2006, there were around 540 employees worked in the company and the company was appointed by WorkCoverSA (now named ReturnToWorkSA) as the sole management agent for workers in New South Wales. The aim of WorkCoverSA is to provide insurance and compensation services for workers in South Australia who get injured when they are working. Employers need to pay an annual insurance premium for employees. As for a case manage agency, EML provides face to face services for workers when they are injured because of their work and also provide services such as financial support and medical health care support to assist workers to get back to the workplace.

In 2008, the company expands its service into the hotel industry in New South Wales. Teamed up with the Australian Hotels Association (NSW) and Clubs NSW, this company established Hospitality Employers Mutual Limited (Hospitality) to provide compensation insurance and compensation scheme service to workers within the hotel industry in New South Wales.

=== 2012–2018 ===
The company further increased its service range in the hospitality industry by cooperating with Clubs NSW to form the Club Employers Mutual in 2012. Club Employers Mutual and Hotel Employers mutual are the two main brands that this company use to provide services in the hotel industry in New South Wales. In the same year when Club Employers Mutual established, Employers Mutual Limited lost approximately 50% of their market share in South Australia due to a second claims agent were introduced to South Australia by WorkCoverSA (now named ReturnToWorkSA).

Employed Mutual Limited rebranded their company in June 2016, changed their trade name to EML, and became an agent for WorkSafe Victoria to provide insurance services, compensation services and mobile case agency services for workers in Victoria. With the goal of " provide customers with a seamless claims management experience across all people insurance covers ", EML is still expanding their service range and type in Australia.

EML partner with icare to hold a mental health seminar about techniques, resources and management tools to assist workers to access healthcare services. It was held in Sydney in August 2017.

EML was appointed by Insurance & Care New South Wales (icare) to become the single claim agent for the NSW workers compensation from 1 January 2018.

== Services ==
As an insurance and compensation company, the basic condition for customers and workers to receive the insurance services is to purchase the minimum essential coverage that the insurance company required. EML offers various insurance and compensation related services to other organisations or companies.

=== Schemes ===
EML manage workers' compensation claims for:

- WorkSafe Victoria
- icare
- iCare insurance for NSW
- ReturnToWork South Australia

In addition, EML also manages the retail group's national self-insurance portfolio for Woolworths.

=== Specialist services ===
==== Workers compensation ====
EML provides financial and medical support to employees who are injured on the job, including necessary medical expense such as physical fees, nursing care and medications. This program is designed to cover and reduce the workers' expense and loss incurred in work-related injured. Work-related injured is an injured to personal health that arising out of, or in the course of the worker's job, including physical injuries, psychiatric or psychological disorders, diseases, aggravation of a pre-existing condition and death from an injury or disease. Workers are including employees, statutory and temporary workers within the organisation or company.

EML provides rehabilitation services to cover medical healthcare and training services to help injured workers to gain their ability and skills and return to the workplace.

==== Self-insurance ====
EML provide self-insurance management services for companies that choose to self insure. This company provides strategies in early intervention and claims management and legislation, medical treatment and recovery services for self-insured companies.

==== Consultancy service ====
EML provides customers with compensation services, claims management, risk management and work health safety consultation. This company provides injured employees with services such as:

- Policy and procedure review
- Injury management and return to work gap analysis
- Return to work systems design
- Development of injury management resources
- Data diagnostics
- Return to Work Coordinator training.

==== Government ====
EML offers services and support for the government. This company is one of the sponsors of the Workforce Improvement Program, which is a program held by the New South Wales government to improve the injury management process by changing the deceases and workers compensation management. EML offers financial support to this program. EML started providing services to Treasury Managed Fund (TMF) since 2005.

== Subsidiaries ==
=== Hospitality Industry Insurance Limited ===
Hospitality Industry Insurance Limited (HII) is an Australian Publish company that was established by Employers Mutual Limited and Australian Hotels Association ( NSW ) and Clubs NSW in 2008. Licensed by APRA & SIRA, it is a workers' compensation company that provide services for workers in NSW. The operations range of this company cover Insurance Agents, Brokers and Service. According to the annual report from this company, Hospitality Employers Mutual Limited generates $83.43 million in revenue and $13.29 million total net profit for the 2018 financial year.

It consists of Club Employers Mutual and Hotel Employers Mutual. With the industry-based workers compensation license from WorkCover and the Australian Prudential Regulation Authority (APRA), Club Employers Mutual is authorised to provide insurance and compensation services for designated hospitality entities in Australia. Partnership with the Australian Hotels Association (NSW), Employers Mutual Limited established Hotel Employers Mutual to provide workers compensation services to the hotel industry in New South Wales.

=== EML NSW Limited ===
EML NSW Limited is a company that represents the operation of EML in NSW. Based in Sydney, NSW, this company follows the New South Wales Workers Compensation Act 1987 license. EML NSW Limited provides workplace risk consultants services, specialised hotel and coal industry services. It is also the case manager of WorkCover SA and an agency of the NSW Treasury Managed Fund. For the 2018 financial year, the company reported revenue of $95,81 million and the net asset of $519,000.

== Corporate governance ==
The company board of directors is made up of a chairman, three non-executive directors and a chief risk officer.

The non-executive directors are:

- Catherine King
- Paul Baker
- Patrick Gurr
- Nikki Britt
- Bruce Hatchman

The members of the Executive leadership team are:

Executive Directors:

- Anthony Fleetwood
- Mark Coyne
- Angus Gluskie
- Cameron McCullagh (Executive Chair)

- Geniere Aplin (Chief Executive)
- Don Ferguson (Chief Executive)
- Matthew Wilson (Chief Risk Officer)

== See also ==
- History of insurance
- Insurance in Australia
- Australian insurance law
