= AASB =

AEPC may refer to:

- Australian Accounting Standards Board, an accounting organization of Australia
- Auditing and Assurance Standards Board, a financial regulatory authority of Canada
