= Association of Accounting Technicians of Sri Lanka =

- ශ්‍රී ලංකා ගණකාධිකරණ ශිල්පීය ආයතනය
- Abbreviation: AATSL
- Formation: 1987; 39 years ago
- Headquarters: Colombo, Sri Lanka
- Region served: Sri Lanka
- Official language: Sinhala, English, Tamil
- Chief Executive Officer: Tishanga Kumarasinghe
- Website: www.aatsl.lk

The Association of Accounting Technicians of Sri Lanka (AATSL) is a Sri Lankan qualification and professional body for vocational accountants which was launched as an initiative that came through the Institute of Chartered Accountants of Sri Lanka (CA Sri Lanka). AAT is a technician level qualification offering higher apprenticeships which entitles those who have completed the exams and obtained relevant supervised work experience to become an accountant.

== History ==
The need for accounting technicians were emphasized in the master plan for Accountancy Education in Sri Lanka prepared by the Asian Development Bank Inception Mission in 1986 and following that AATSL was established in December 1987 on the model of the Association of Accounting Technicians (UK) and subsequently AAT Ireland (called Institute of Accounting Technicians Ireland) was formed in April 1983.

== Professional recognition ==
AAT Sri Lanka is registered under the Companies Act No 17 of 1982 and re-registered under the Companies Act No 7 of 2007, as a company limited by guarantee. Two years after its inception, the institute was admitted to the associate membership of the International Federation of Accountants (IFAC) which is a key body for accountants. AAT Sri Lanka also has the distinction of being the first associate member of the Confederation of Asian and Pacific Accountants (CAPA), a leading network of accounting bodies in the region.

== Governing council ==
AATSL is governed by a governing council which has the primary responsibility of presiding over the AATSL's affairs and provide efficient governance for the benefit of all stakeholders. It has 16 non-executive autonomous members who are either elected by the members of the association or nominated by various bodies or persons. All council members serve in an independent capacity and do not receive any remuneration for their services.

== Qualifications ==
Accounting technicians are mid-level professional accountants immediately after obtaining associate membership (MAAT). However, by gaining experience in the field of accountancy they can reach senior technician Level (SAT) and fellow technician Level (FMAAT), which are considered as groomed professional accountants. One can add more value and recognition to this qualification by gaining qualifications in other professional accountancy bodies.

== AAT business school ==
AAT Business School is a strategic business unit (SBU) operating under the AATSL, committed towards enhancing competencies and recognition of those seeking individual development. It was officially inaugurated on 22 January 2014 by Mr. Warren Allen, the President of The International Federation of Accountants (IFAC) (2012–14). The AAT business school offers programs which can be categorized into information technology, management development program (MDP), taxation, English language and people and leadership skills (PLS).

== See also ==
- Accounting in Sri Lanka
- Association of Accounting Technicians
- Institute of Chartered Accountants of Sri Lanka
- Institute of Certified Management Accountants of Sri Lanka
