= Sun British College =

- சூரிய பிரித்தானிய கல்லூரி
- Former names: Sun British Business Management College
- Type: Public
- Established: 2007
- Location: Vavuniya, Northern Province, 43000, Sri Lanka
- Campus: urban
- Language: English, Tamil
- Colours: Yellow, Red & Blue
- Website: www.suncollege.uk

Sun British College (registered as Sun British Business Management College, Tamil: சூரிய பிரித்தானிய கல்லூரி) is a private college in Vavuniya, Sri Lanka. It is recognized by the Association of Accounting Technicians of Sri Lanka.

== Location ==
It is located in the Northern Province in Sri Lanka. It is the only college conducts degree programmes for the students from war affected districts like Vavuniya, Mannar, Kilinochchi and Mullaitivu.

== Faculties ==
- Faculty of Linguistics
- Faculty of Education
- Faculty of Information & Communication Technology
