= Chartered Tax Adviser =

Chartered Tax Adviser may refer to:

- Chartered Tax Adviser (Australia)
- Chartered Tax Adviser (UK)
