= Accounting Professional & Ethical Standards Board =

- Formation: February 2006
- Purpose: Develop professional and ethical standards for professional accountants in the public interest
- Official language: English
- Website: http://www.apesb.org.au/

The Accounting Professional & Ethical Standards Board (APESB) is an Australian, independent, national body that establishes the mandatory code of ethics and professional standards for accounting professionals who are of CPA Australia, the Institute of Chartered Accountants, or the Institute of Public Accountants.

== Organization and mandate ==
The APESB was established by CPA Australia and the Institute of Chartered Accountants in Australia in February 2006, and later that year the National Institute of Accountants (now the Institute of Public Accountants) became the third member of the APESB. The three organizations jointly fund APESB. Members of these three major Australian accounting bodies have a responsibility to act in the public interest. They are expected to act with objectivity and integrity in their dealings with investors, governments, clients, employers and employees.

== Governance ==
APESB is a company limited by guarantee. The role, structure and responsibilities of the Board of Directors are outlined in the Board Charter.

== Relationship to international standards ==
APESB has adopted professional and ethical standards issued by the International Federation of Accountants (IFAC) with additional requirements that consider local norms in Australia. The 2006 version of the Code of Ethics for Professional Accountants was based on the code issued by the International Ethics Standards Board for Accountants (IESBA) of the IFAC. Some changes were made to align it with Australian legislation. A revised Code of Ethics was issued in July 2009, and another December 2010. In the amended code, Australia-specific requirements were removed, and a warning was added to ensure that accountants comply with Australian laws. APESB contributes to the development of international standards through submissions to the IESBA, and as a member of the IESBA National Standards Setters group.

== Activities ==
APESB develops standards after considering market and stakeholder needs; it has a well-documented process for developing professional and ethical standards. Additionally, APESB reviews each new standard after six months of implementation and annually thereafter to ensure that they remain up-to-date relevant. Stakeholder input is collected digitally in the review processes.
