= Cecil Hanify =

Australian cricketer

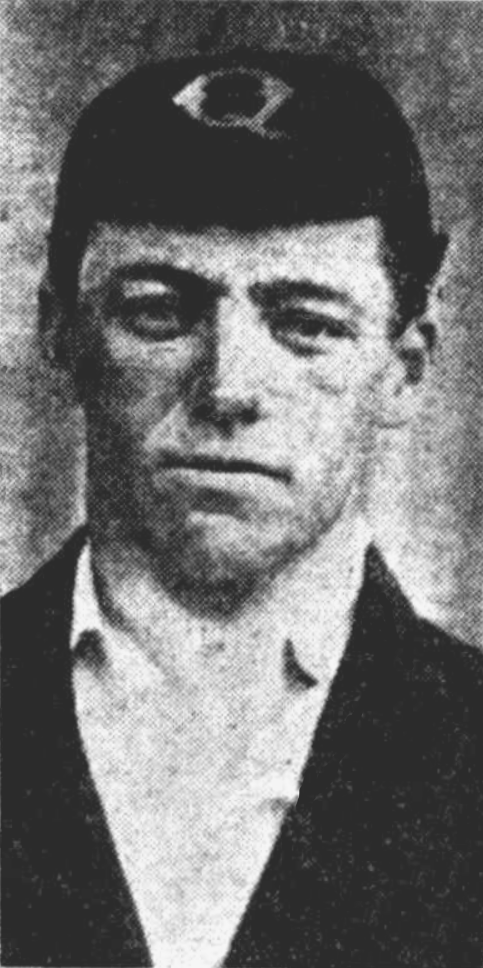

Personal information
- Full name: Cecil Page Hanify
- Born: 1 August 1887; Brisbane, Queensland, Australia
- Died: 28 October 1964 (aged 77); Manly, Queensland, Australia
- Source: Cricinfo, 3 October 2020

Cecil Page Hanify MVO FICA (1 August 1887 – 28 October 1964) was an Australian cricketer. He played in one first-class match for Queensland in 1912/13. He was also a chief clerk.

== See also ==
- List of Queensland first-class cricketers
