= Institute of Chartered Accountants Australia =

Australian professional body

- Abbreviation: ICAA
- Predecessor: Australasian Corporation of Public Accountants
- Successor: Chartered Accountants Australia and New Zealand
- Formation: 19 June 1928
- Dissolved: 31 December 2014; 11 years ago
- Legal status: Chartered body
- Region served: Australia
- Members: 61,000
- Students: 12,000
- Website: www.charteredaccountantsanz.com

The Institute of Chartered Accountants in Australia was the professional accounting body representing Chartered Accountants in Australia before it merged with the New Zealand Institute of Chartered Accountants to become Chartered Accountants Australia and New Zealand.

It had over 61,000 members and some 12,000 students. It was one of three major legally recognised Professional Accountancy bodies in Australia. The others being CPA Australia and Institute of Public Accountants. It is a founding member of the Global Accounting Alliance (GAA). Members of the Institute are part of the international accounting coalition of the world's premier accounting bodies, the GAA. Chartered Accountants audit 100 per cent of the Top ASX-listed companies in Australia.

In November 2013 Members of The Institute of Chartered Accountants in Australia and the New Zealand Institute of Chartered Accountants voted yes on a proposal to create One New Institute: "Chartered Accountants Australia and New Zealand".

New Zealand Institute of Chartered Accountants and the Institute of Chartered Accountants in Australia (ICAA) amalgamated to become Chartered Accountants Australia and New Zealand.

== History ==
=== Corporation of Accountants of Australia ===
Coat of Arms for Institute of Chartered Accountants Australia

The Corporation of Accountants of Australia was granted the official coat of arms by the College of Arms in 1905. In 1906, the Corporation of Accountants of Australia and the Sydney Institute of Public Accountants moved to create a national accounting body of all practising public accountants in Australia.

=== Australasian Corporation of Public Accountants ===
In 1907, negotiations between the Corporation of Accountants of Australia, the Sydney Institute of Public Accountants and the Institutes in Melbourne, resulted in the formation of the Australasian Corporation of Public Accountants (ACPA) on 14 June. The ACPA membership was composed exclusively of practising public accountants.

=== Institute of Chartered Accountants in Australia ===
The Institute of Chartered Accountants in Australia was formed with the granting of a Royal Charter on 19 June 1928, to Thomas Brentnall, George Mason Allard and Henry Joshua Wise on behalf of the public accountants of Australia. The ICAA was the first accountancy body outside the United Kingdom to receive a Royal Charter.

On 26 October 1929 The Earl Marshal of England granted the current arms to the institute. The arms include the Latin motto 'Nec Timens Nec Favens' which translates to 'Without Fear or Favour'.

The Institute now operates under a Supplemental Royal Charter (amended from time to time) granted by the Governor-General on behalf of Queen Elizabeth II on 19 August 2005.

=== Chartered Accountants Australia and New Zealand ===
After voting on the merger with the New Zealand Institute of Chartered Accountants the bodies formed Chartered Accountants Australia and New Zealand 31 December 2014.

CA ANZ is a professional body of over 120,000 Chartered Accountants around the world. CA ANZ focuses on the education and lifelong learning of its members, and on advocacy and thought leadership in areas of public interest and business.

== Admission to membership ==
To become a member of the institute, Chartered Accountants complete the Chartered Accountants Program which includes study of the Graduate Diploma in Chartered Accounting (GradDipCA) and three years of practical experience. Entry to the Program is available for graduates who hold an accounting degree, however those holding non-accounting degrees may also be permitted entry after some additional requirements are met.

=== Accounting degree ===
To take this path you will have either a bachelor or master's degree in commerce, business or accounting from an Institute accredited Australian university. The commerce and business degrees will require a major in accounting, in order to qualify.

=== Non Accounting degree ===
There are three routes for non-accounting graduates can take to qualify for the Chartered Accountants Program:

1. Institute accredited Graduate Conversion course: Available from most Australian universities
2. Entrance exam: Available for non-accounting graduates with significant on-the-job accounting experience and employer support
3. A Graduate Certificate of Chartered Accounting Foundations from Deakin University.

=== Graduate Diploma in Chartered Accounting ===
The GradDipCA component of the Chartered Accountants Program consists of the following seven modules which each take between 7-9 weeks of part-time study to complete:

- Ethics and Business
- Risk and Technology
- Financial Accounting and Reporting
- Tax (AU or NZ)
- Business Performance
- Audit and Risk
- Integrated Chartered Accounting Practice (ICAP)

Additionally, two electives must be completed from the following list:

- Advanced Tax (AU or NZ)
- Assurance
- Data Analytics and Insights
- Strategy and Performance
- Advanced Financial Reporting
- Financial Modelling
- Sustainability for Accountants

The institute is the only Australian professional accounting body that is a government accredited Higher Education provider. Unlike other Australian accounting designations, the Chartered Accountants Program leads to the awarding of a Graduate Diploma. The Australian Chartered Accountant qualification is recognised as an "approved qualification" - a significant requirement for auditor registration purposes in the UK.

=== Mentored Practical experience ===
To meet the practical experience requirements to become a Chartered Accountant in Australia, you must:

1. Be employed with an organisation recognised by the Institute for at least 17.5hpw whilst completing the GradDipCA
2. Recording your work experience with a Chartered Accountant mentor
3. Apply for full membership after completing the GradDipCA and accumulating at least three years of practical work experience.

== Membership ==
There are a number for different membership categories:

- Members: Have the designation CA after their name.
- Fellows: Have the designation FCA (Fellow Chartered Accountant) after their name. These members have been nominated for advancement Fellowship and have been a continuous member for 10 years and have been in a senior position for seven years. To be advanced to Fellow the member must have demonstrated 'leadership'
- Affiliate membership: Have an accounting degree and at least five years membership, but have not completed the Chartered Accountants Program.
- Teacher of Accountancy: For teachers to obtain membership, they are required to have completed a Doctorate or Masters by research with a major in an accounting related field, held a senior academic position for not less than five years, have appropriate Australian Taxation and Corporation Law knowledge and have references from two Chartered Accountants and their Head of School, and another significant academic
- Certificate of Public Practice: Firms or members who offer their services to the public as 'Chartered Accountants'.

== Continuing education ==
Chartered Accountants continue their education to ensure they are able to provide the highest standards of integrity and professionalism. A Chartered Accountant must complete a total of 120 hours of Continuing Professional Education every three years.

== Ethical Standards ==
The institute collaborates with CPA Australia and the Institute of Public Accountants in supporting the Accounting Professional & Ethical Standards Board (APESB), founded in 2006. APESB publishes ethics-related standards that must be followed by accountants in Australia based on the international standards published by the International Ethics Standards Board for Accountants (IESBA).

== See also ==
- Tax Institute (Australia)
- List of Australian organisations with royal patronage
- Global Accounting Alliance
- International Qualification Examination
- University of Queensland Business Association
