= Margin on services =

Margin on Services (MoS) is a financial reporting method developed by the Australian Accounting Standards Board that relates to life insurance companies in Australia and New Zealand.

Under MoS, the value of future surpluses expected to emerge under a life insurance contract is first determined and then spread over the projected life of the policy. The spreading is normally done as a percent of projected claims in each future year, although other measures can be used, such as premium or expenses. It is this approach to spreading which resulted in the method being called "Margin on Services".

Other characteristics of the MoS framework include:

- realistic projections
- policies can be assets
- a risk-free discount rate is used (unless there is market risk in the projections)
- future surpluses are recalculated at each reporting date, but are not capitalised to/from profit at that date, although loss-recognition events are possible

The method is specified in prudential standard LPS 340 issued by the Australian Prudential Regulatory Authority.

== See also ==
- Insurance in Australia
