= Institute of Chartered Accountants of Sri Lanka =

Organization

- ශ්‍රී ලංකා වරලත් ගණකාධිකාරී ආයතනය
- Abbreviation: CA Sri Lanka
- Formation: 30 January 1959; 67 years ago
- Legal status: Body corporate established by a special act of the Parliament of Sri Lanka
- Headquarters: Colombo, Sri Lanka
- Region served: Sri Lanka
- Members: 7, 000
- Official language: English, Sinhala and Tamil
- President: Tishan Subasinghe
- Students: 44,000
- Website: www.casrilanka.com

The Institute of Chartered Accountants of Sri Lanka (CA Sri Lanka) is a professional accountancy body in Sri Lanka. The Institute was established by Act of Parliament, No. 23 of 1959 as the sole organization in Sri Lanka with the right to awarding the Chartered Accountant designation. The Institute is responsible for setting Accounting and Auditing Standards in Sri Lanka, and is considered the National Body of Accountants in the country.

== Membership ==
In Sri Lanka, only members of CA Sri Lanka can practice as "Chartered Accountant". There are two grades of members;

- Associate (ACA)
- Fellow (FCA)

Associate membership is gained after completing three levels of examinations and serving as a clerk serving under articles with a member of the Institute in practice or with a member of the Institute who is a salaried employee in the service of a firm of accountants for a minimum three-year practical training period. They are known as articled clerks during this period. Fellowship is awarded to senior Chartered accountants.

Chartered accountants holding practicing certificates may also become "Registered Auditors", who are able to perform statutory financial audits in accordance with the Companies Act, No. 07 of 2007. Chartered Accountants can also register as Company Secretaries.

== Affiliations ==
The Institute of Chartered Accountants of Sri Lanka enjoys agreements with the Institute of Chartered Accountants in England and Wales, CPA Australia, and several other leading international accountancy bodies.

CA Sri Lanka is a member of the International Federation of Accountants, Confederation of Asian and Pacific Accountants and a founder member of the South Asian Federation of Accountants. CA Sri Lanka is also a member of the Chartered Accountants Worldside

== Criticisms ==
CA Sri Lanka has been criticized for allowing audit firms (especially firms which carry the name as Big Four) to take undue advantage of articled clerks (interns) who would have to work in these firms for low wages to cover the practical training period required by the institute, which intern is headed by partners of these firms. Yet, institute hasn't taken any action towards this.

== See also ==
- Accounting in Sri Lanka
- Association of Accounting Technicians of Sri Lanka
- Institute of Certified Management Accountants of Sri Lanka
