= In Conversation with Alex Malley =

- Genre: Talk show
- Presented by: Alex Malley
- Country of origin: Australia
- Original language: English
- No. of seasons: 3
- No. of episodes: 24

Production
- Running time: 30 Minutes

Original release
- Network: Nine Network
- Release: 7 February 2016 – April 2017

In Conversation with Alex Malley is an Australian television interview show on the Nine Network.

The program was funded by CPA Australia and featured its controversial then-CEO Alex Malley interviewing leaders from the world of politics, business and entertainment.

== Cancellation ==
The TV show was abruptly cancelled in 2017 when Malley was fired as CPA Australia's CEO and stripped of his lifetime membership.

Malley's termination followed a dispute with CPA members over his $1.7m salary as well as the use of CPA funds to produce and promote In Conversation with Alex Malley and otherwise build Malley's personal profile.

A report published following Malley's departure revealed that CPA paid Channel Nine $4.16 million to broadcast the program as well as spending another $1.2 million to advertise the program on billboards.

All mentions of the TV show were removed from CPA's website within days of Malley's termination.

== Season One ==
Episode	Airdate	Guest
1	7 February 2016	Laurie Oakes
2	14 February 2016	Alpha Cheng
3	21 February 2016	Gillian Triggs
4	28 February 2016	Nolan Bushnell
5	6 March 2016	Deborah Knight
6	13 March 2016	Tim Costello
7	20 March 2016	Bill Shorten
8	27 March 2016	Charlie Teo

== Season Two ==
Episode	Airdate	Guest
1	9 October 2016	Andre Rieu
2	16 October 2016	Neale Daniher
3	30 October 2016	Peter Overton
4	6 November 2016	Germaine Greer
5	20 November 2016	Layne Beachley
6	27 November 2016	John Frost
7	4 December 2016	Alexander Downer
8	11 December 2016	Fiona Wood

== Season Three ==
Episode	Airdate	Guest
1	19 February 2017	Michael Clarke
2	26 February 2017	Rudy Giuliani
3	5 March 2017	Nadia Comaneci
4	12 March 2017	Derryn Hinch
5	19 March 2017	Henry Winkler
6	26 March 2017	Andy Thomas
7	2 April 2017	Gai Waterhouse
8	9 April 2017	Don Meij

== Reception ==
Kylie Northover of The Sydney Morning Herald wrote of the interview with the violinist and conductor André Rieu, "It's a non-threatening half-hour chat with the world's most successful classical musician ... It's a pleasant enough half-hour, but don't expect any deep revelations. Justin Burke praised the show in The Weekend Australian, stating, "This might not be the most revolutionary TV format: seated interviewer facing seated interviewee. Readers, particularly of the business pages, will have their views about the host Alex Malley. (Mine are that he does a solid job here.) But there can be no debate that an interview with Andy Thomas, the only Australian-born professional astronaut, is anything other than unmissable TV."
