= Federation of Tax Advisers =

The Federation of Tax Advisers (formerly "FTA") is a former professional body concerned with UK taxation issues. The FTA was established in 1997. On 3 June 2009 it became a part of the IFA Group through a merger with the Institute of Financial Accountants.

== Purpose ==
The Federation of Tax Advisors ("FTA") regulated professional tax advisers on a voluntary basis. The FTA campaigns for a fairer and less complex tax system. Its purpose was to encourage the study of taxation and to promote best practice in the administration of taxation in the UK. It also provided a qualification and regulatory structure for its members.

== Membership ==
Persons who met the requirements of relevant work experience and accountancy and tax examination requirements, were eligible to apply for membership. Members were denoted by the acronym/ post nominal "FTA" indicating they were a member of the Federation of Tax Advisors.

== Merger ==
As indicated above, on 3 June 2009, the FTA became a part of the IFA Group through a merger with the Institute of Financial Accountants (IFA) and is now its tax faculty.

Following this merger, some former FTA members became Tax Advisors of the IFA. There are two levels of tax advisors of the IFA:

- Associate Tax Advisors of the IFA, denoted by the acronym/ post nominals "ATA". They will have at least 3 years experience in the taxation profession, and hold an accountancy and finance accountancy qualification that covers the IFA Direct education programme or equivalent.
- Fellow Tax Advisors of the Institute of Financial Accountants, denoted by the acronym / post nominals "FTA". FTA is the Institute’s highest tax adviser grade of membership available. They must have been working in a senior role in the tax profession for no fewer than 10 years, the last five at a senior level in taxation, having been a member of the IFA for seven consecutive years at ATA level.

== IFA Practising Certification for Tax Advisors ==
Members at Associate or Fellow level may apply for and be granted an IFA tax practising certificate subject to meeting the eligibility criteria. However, this certificate will only allow them to be supervised for taxation work. If they provide services to the public that are not covered by their tax practising certificate, such as accountancy, this can affect their membership and supervision with the IFA.

An IFA member applying for a tax practising certificate must:

- Be a current member of good standing at either Associate or Fellow level.
- Have worked in the UK for at least two years in an appropriate tax role.
- Be practising in the UK offering taxation services to the public.
- Comply with the IFA's continuing professional development (CPD) requirements.
- Have professional indemnity insurance cover.
- Be supervised under the Money Laundering Regulations 2007.
- Provide evidence of having achieved the IFA taxation qualification or equivalent.
- Provide evidence of having completed an ethics assessment.
