= Tax Institute (Australia) =

The Tax Institute
- Type: Professional association
- Headquarters: Sydney, NSW
- Region served: Australia
- Official language: English
- Website: www.taxinstitute.com.au

The Tax Institute, formerly the Taxation Institute of Australia, is a member-based association of tax professionals in Australia. Members include accountants, lawyers, and academics.

== History ==
The Tax Institute was founded in July 1943 by a Sydney accountant named Harold Irving.

In March 2010 The Tax Institute and the Institute of Chartered Accountants in Australia jointly submitted an extensive review of the government's consolidation regime to the Board of Taxation. In August 2010 The Tax Institute welcomed the establishment of the Tax System Advisory Board, while calling for fundamental tax reform. In January 2011 The Tax Institute commented on the Treasury's discussion paper: "Implementation of the recommendations of Treasury's review of the GST margin scheme".

== Description ==
As of 2016 the Tax Institute had over 12,000 members. The Institute provides resources and education to its members, and participates in formulating tax policy with the government. Executives from the institute head up the Australian Tax Research Foundation, a non-profit organisation that researches tax reform at the federal, state and local government levels.

The Tax Institute provides input to the Board of Taxation, a non-statutory government advisory body charged with contributing a business and broader community perspective to improving the design of taxation laws and their operation.

The Tax Institute is a member of Asia Oceania Tax Consultants' Association (AOTCA).

== Membership levels ==
There are three levels of voting membership, in ascending order of importance:

1. Associates (ATI)
2. Fellows (FTI)
3. Chartered Tax Advisers (CTA)

There are also affiliate memberships and student memberships, who do not have voting rights.

== See also ==
- Tax advisor
