= Elwyn Flint =

Australian linguist and academic

- Born: 12 May 1910
- Died: 10 December 1983 (aged 73)

Academic background
- Education: University of Queensland (BA, MA)

Academic work
- Discipline: Linguist
- Sub-discipline: Australian Aboriginal languages

Elwyn Flint (12 May 1910 – 10 December 1983) was an Australian linguist and academic, who undertook extensive surveys of English languages and dialects throughout Queensland, in particular Australian Aboriginal communities in the 1960s.

== Early life ==
Elwyn Henry Flint was born on 12 May 1910 to Edmund Henry Flint and his wife Mabel. He was a cousin of the Rev. A.C. Flint. He attended Windsor State School and Brisbane State High School and won an open scholarship at the age of 16 to attend the University of Queensland in 1928. He graduated in 1930 with a B.A., first class honours degree in modern languages and literature and a government gold medal for outstanding merit.

== Career ==
He took up work as a Reader at the University of Queensland until this contract expired in 1932. He enrolled in a M.A. with a thesis entitled, Modern methods of learning and teaching foreign languages, with special reference to Australian conditions. From 1936 to 1938 he attended St Francis' Theological College and was ordained as a priest of the Church of England. He served as curate of St Andrews Church in Lutwyche, was vicar of Monto, and became an army chaplain between 1943 and 1945. He also became an army intelligence officer during this period, learning Japanese to help interrogate Japanese prisoners of war. Following his discharge from the army, he eventually returned to lecturing at the University of Queensland in 1949 and completed his M.A. He commenced research towards a PhD with a thesis entitled "The living theatre in England from 1914–1954", but did not complete these studies. He studied Chinese drama and Japanese Noh plays during this research period. He was promoted to senior lecturer in 1958. He produced plays for student dramatic societies and was an active secretary of the Staff Tennis Club. Flint retired in 1975.

== Catalogue of Aboriginal languages and dialects of English ==
Flint was interested in language variation. In 1956 he undertook work to study dialects of English spoken on Norfolk Island and how these dialects were influenced by non-resident 'migrant' English. These recordings were made of natural conversation. During the 1960s, Flint took extensive audio recordings of Aboriginal and Torres Strait Island communities and the English spoken in these communities for the Australian Research Council funded Queensland Speech Survey. 29 communities including Yarrabah, Cherbourg, Woorabinda, Palm Island, Doomadgee, Bloomfield River, Aurukun, Weipa were canvassed with the assistance of three students. Coral Readdy for Stradbroke Island and Cherbourg, Tom Dutton for Palm Island and Diane Alexander for Yarrabah and Woorabinda summarised findings in their respective theses. Flint published analyses of the phonological and grammatical features of Aboriginal English. Flint also collected Aboriginal language material from Yuulngu (North East Arhnemland). He was also interested in Asian, European, Pacific and Indonesian languages. Some of this material is kept in the Department of English at the University of Queensland.

== Memberships ==
Australian Linguistic Society

== Legacy ==
Flint died on 10 December 1983. 57 boxes of Flint's papers and his recordings of language variation in Indigenous communities are available through the University of Queensland Fryer Library.
