= Institute of Public Accountants =

Australian professional body

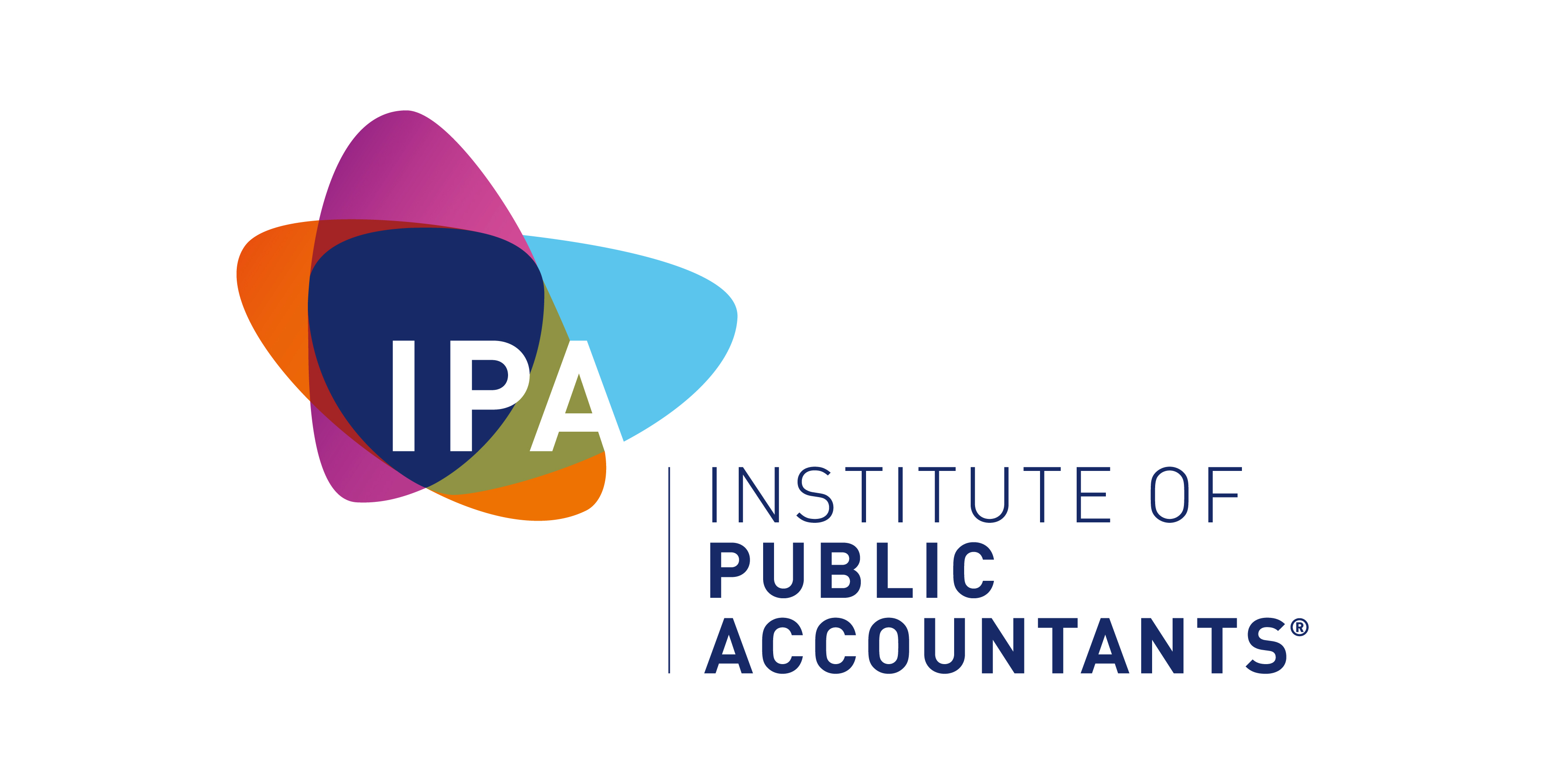
- Industry: Accounting and Finance
- Founded: Melbourne Victoria, Australia (1923 as IFCA)
- Head Office: Melbourne, Australia
- Locations: Australia, Beijing, Kuala Lumpur
- Area: Global
- President: Cheryl Mallett
- CEO: Andrew Conway
- Members: 25,000 (2023)
- Designations: AIPA, MIPA & FIPA
- Motto: making small business count
- Formerly: National Institute of Accountants
- Website: publicaccountants.org.au

The Institute of Public Accountants (IPA) is one of the three legally recognised professional bodies for accountants in Australia. The IPA represents more than 25,000 voting members working in industry, commerce, government, academia and professional practice.

The organisation rebranded from its previous title, the National Institute of Accountants (NIA), on 2 May 2011.

In 2012, the IPA was ranked 19th in the BRW Most Innovative Companies list.

The IPA launched a digital hub in early 2013.

== History ==
The old NIA Coat of Arms represented integrity, respect, teamwork and a dedication to knowledge and education.

The Institute of Public Accountants (IPA) is one of Australia's oldest representative professional bodies, formed in 1923.

- 1923 - Institute of Factory and Cost Accountants, formed in Melbourne, Victoria.
- 1950 - Institute of Taxation and Cost Accountants, name change.
- 1957 - National Institute of Accountants, name change.
- 1967 - Institute of Commercial Studies, name change.
- 1970 - Institute of Affiliate Accountants, name change.
- 1988 - National Institute of Accountants, adoption of the precedent name.
- 2002 - NIA gazetted as an authorised assessing authority for skilled migration to Australia.
- 2004 - NIA became a member of the International Federation of Accountants (IFAC).
- 2007 - NIA became a member of Asia Oceania Tax Consultants' Association (AOTCA).
- 2011 - Institute of Public Accountants, name change
- 2011 - IPA became a member of the Confederation of Asian and Pacific Accountants (CAPA).
- 2012 - IPA launches "My Public Accountant" package for accountants in public practice.
- 2012 - Named number 19 in 2012 BRW Most Innovative Companies List
- 2013 - Launched the Public Accountant digital hub
- 2015 - IPA amalgamation with the Institute of Financial Accountants (IFA) of United Kingdom, forming the IPA Group.
- 2020 - Association of Accounting Technicians (AAT) of Australia becomes a member of the global IPA Group.

== Membership levels ==
The IPA has three levels of membership:

- Associate (AIPA)
- Member (MIPA)
- Fellow (FIPA)

Following the January 2015 merger between the IPA and the UK Institute of Financial Accountants (IFA), several of the IFA's membership tiers incorporate IPA post-nominal letters. Many Australian-based IPA members attain reciprocal recognition – in which case, their membership is augmented via one of three options:

- Associate, IPA and Intermediate Financial Accountant, IFA (AIPA IFA)
- Member, IPA and Associate Financial Accountant, IFA (MIPA AFA)
- Fellow, IPA and Fellow Financial Accountant, IFA (FIPA FFA).

Student Membership

Students studying towards an accounting qualification can join as a student member, free of charge. Student members have access to networking opportunities, receive monthly e-newsletters, and employment tips.

Additionally, graduate IPA student members and non-members who have completed their accounting degree or advanced diploma within the last three years are eligible for the Graduate Associate level of membership (GAIPA). This level of membership was designed to assist in the transition of students to full membership in their early career years. It provides recently graduated students with a significantly reduced rate of membership, without missing out on the benefits that full IPA membership provides.

Retired Members

Retired members are eligible for reduced membership fees and specific offers designed to assist semi-retired members in practice.

=== Mentored Experience Program ===
The Mentored Experience Program (MEP) requires members to undergo a formal mentoring process gaining structured work experience. With the guidance of an IPA approved mentor, usually a fully qualified accountant from one of the three professional bodies, the MEP provides the framework for members to increase both their practical experience and knowledge in the workplace.

=== IPA Program ===
The IPA Program is an accredited educational pathway designed and delivered in partnership with Deakin University. The IPA program comprises two distinct but related awards: the Graduate Certificate of Public Accounting (GCPA) and the Deakin University Master of Business Administration (MBA). Depending on previous qualifications, members may be required to complete the GCPA component before advancing to MIPA status and completing the Deakin MBA. The IPA Program is delivered entirely online, allowing members to study at their own pace.

The GCPA is designated by the Australian Qualifications Framework Authority (AQF) at Level 8. The Master of Business Administration (MBA) is designated by the AQF at Level 9. The Australian Qualifications Framework (AQF) establishes the quality of Australian qualifications. Members of the IPA who complete the IPA Program and obtain the Deakin MBA achieve a higher level of qualification than those from either CPA Australia (no AQF designation) or Chartered Accountants Australia and New Zealand (AQF Level 8).

The previous IPA Program awards were respectively named the Graduate Certificate in Professional Accounting and the Master of Commerce (Professional Accounting), both awarded by the University of New England.

=== Continuing Professional Development (CPD) ===
All members of the IPA (except retired members) must complete a minimum of 120 hours of CPD over a three-year period, with a minimum of 20 hours to be completed in any single financial year. CPD can be completed in either structured or unstructured forms, however, the maximum amount of unstructured learning permitted is 30 hours. IPA Members must also comply with IPA Pronouncement 7, detailing the requirements of CPD and IPA Membership. The IPA runs a series of face-to-face and online professional development events every year, open to IPA members and the public.

=== Members of other professional bodies ===
Members of certain other professional bodies may apply for certain membership levels with the IPA at an equivalent level based on their existing qualifications. These include members of Institute of Cost Accountants of India (CMA), Association of Chartered Certified Accountants (ACCA), Chartered Institute of Management Accountants (CIMA), CPA Australia (CPA) and Chartered Accountants Australia and New Zealand (CA ANZ). The IPA accepts CPA and CA ANZ membership as entry level qualifications. The IPA accepts the professional examinations (plus membership) for certain overseas professional bodies.

The IPA collaborates with CPA Australia and Chartered Accountants Australia and New Zealand in supporting the Accounting Professional & Ethical Standards Board (APESB), founded in 2006. APESB publishes ethics-related standards that must be followed by accountants in Australia based on the international standards published by the International Ethics Standards Board for Accountants (IESBA).

== Mutual recognition ==
The IPA has a mutual recognition agreement in place with The South African Institute of Professional Accountants (SAIPA). Formerly known as Institute of Certified Public Accountants of South Africa.

MIPA/FIPA members of the IPA are recognised by the UK's Chartered Institute for Securities & Investment (CISI) for admission to CISI's full membership (MCSI). Full membership of the CISI is recognised by several national investment professional bodies such as the Financial Services Institute of Australasia (FINSIA), formerly the Australian Institute of Banking and Finance and the Hong Kong Securities Institute (HKSI).

In November 2010 the IPA hosted a delegation of senior executives from Nigeria's peak accounting body, the Association of National Accountants of Nigeria (ANAN). An MOU was signed with ANAN.

In March 2011 the IPA entered into an MOU with peak management accounting body in India, the Institute of Cost Accountants of India.

In 2012, the IPA and the Institute of Financial Accountants in the United Kingdom announced that they signed and exchanged a formal Collaboration Agreement. In December 2014, the Members of the Institute of Financial Accountants voted in favour to formally merge with the IPA to operate under a new IPA Group.

In April 2013 the IPA and the SMSF Professionals' Association (SPAA) reached a mutual understanding to work together in areas such as accreditation, advocacy, research and policy development, organisational efficiencies, and education.

In August 2019, the IPA and the Association of Accounting Technicians Sri Lanka (AAT SL) entered into an MOU.

In July 2020, the Association of Accounting Technicians Australia (AAT) became a member of the IPA Group.

In February 2022, the IPA signed a Mutual Recognition Agreement with the Fiji Institute of Accountants (FIA), allowing FIA members to join IPA at an equivalent level.

== Market recognition ==
The IPA has the same Australian legislative recognition as the other two Australian accounting bodies, CPA Australia (CPA) and the Chartered Accountants Australia and New Zealand (CA ANZ). In particular, the three accounting bodies are defined as "professional accounting bodies" in the Corporations Act 2001. Such recognition entitles each of the three bodies to nominate a representative to the Australian Financial Reporting Council, the Australian Government's peak body responsible for providing oversight of the setting of accounting and auditing standards as well as monitoring the effectiveness of auditor independence requirements in Australia and giving the Government reports and advice on these matters.

The PNA designation was introduced in 2000 as part of a strategy to upgrade the standing of IPA, then NIA, in the Australian market. At the time, to become a PNA, the applicant required a university degree in accounting plus 3 years work experience in accounting.

The IPA became a member of the International Federation of Accountants (IFAC) in November 2004. In order to obtain IFAC membership, the IPA upgraded the academic requirements for the PNA designation, including the requirement of post-graduate qualifications, developed in conjunction with the University of New England.

From 1 July 2005, the IPA upgraded the experience requirements for the PNA designation to a three-year competence-based mentored experience program. Applicants for this class of membership must demonstrate to a professionally qualified accountant that they have the competence to undertake various tasks required by the IPA. The IPA is recognised in Government forums and represented on various committees. These include those of the Australian Securities and Investments Commission and the Australian Taxation Office.

From 2 May 2011, the NIA was rebranded as the Institute of Public Accountants. In part this rebrand and repositioning is with a view to increase recognition and awareness as well as strengthen designations both nationally and globally. Since this repositioning, full members (MIPAs and FIPAs) of the IPA use the designation "Public Accountant".

== Qualifications assessment ==
Effective from 1 July 2002, the IPA was gazetted by the Australian Minister for Immigration as an authorised assessing authority for accountants seeking to migrate to Australia under Australia's skilled migration program. This gives the IPA the authority to assess the accounting qualifications of such persons.

Successful QAI applicants are eligible for membership, the IPA assesses for the same core knowledge areas for both membership and QAI.

== Public practice and BAS work ==
=== Public Practice Certificate Holder ===
Members at the MIPA or FIPA level of the IPA may apply for a Public Practice Certificate after satisfying additional requirements.

=== Public BAS Practitioner ===
Members who provide BAS services only may apply for a Public BAS Practitioner Certificate after satisfying additional requirements.
