= Australian Chiropractors Association =

Chiropractors' Association of Australia
- Formation: September 1990
- Type: Professional association
- Headquarters: Parramatta, New South Wales
- Location: Australia
- Members: 3000+ as of 2025
- Official language: English
- President: Dr Billy Chow
- Key people: CEO: Alex Malley
- Website: https://www.chiro.org.au/

The Australian Chiropractors Association (ACA), founded in 1990 as the Chiropractors' Association of Australia (CAA), is the largest association of chiropractors and chiropractic students in Australia.

Following a restructure of the Association into a single entity, on 28 May 2018 the name was changed to the Australian Chiropractors Association.

== Mission ==
The ACA's stated mission is to provide leadership and facilitate unity and excellence within the profession. It aims to assist members in delivering patient-centred, holistic, natural, competent, and effective health care. The ACA also claims to engage with stakeholders including governments, academic institutions, media, and the public, as well as, facilitate and promote communication between members and non-members. They further state that they wish to develop and promote chiropractic practice, education, and research, as well as, set and maintain standards of care.

== Relocation ==
Following the restructure in 1990, the association's headquarters were moved from Penrith to Parramatta.
