= Alex Malley =

Australian accountant

- Education: Trinity Grammar School
- Alma mater: University of New South Wales
- Occupation: Accountant
- Known for: CEO, CPA Australia (2009–17)
- Television: In Conversation with Alex Malley

Alex Malley, is an Australian accountant and business executive who is currently the CEO of the Australian Chiropractors Association since 2022, and the former Chief Executive Officer of CPA Australia from 2009 to 2017. He was removed by the CPA board of directors in late June 2017 after months of controversy regarding his salary and the use of CPA funds for self-promotion of his book and TV program.

== Early life ==
The son of Maltese-Greek parents, Malley grew up in the inner Sydney suburb of Strathfield, where he attended Trinity Grammar School. In 1980–1985, Malley attended the University of New South Wales, receiving a Bachelor of Commerce in 1983, and a Master of Commerce in 1985.

== Career ==
Malley began his career working in finance at the Commonwealth Bank. He quit the job and began working as a finance lecturer first at the University of Western Sydney, and then as an accounting academic at Macquarie University from 1993. In 2006, Malley was an associate professor in accounting and was allegedly allowed to resign his position at the university, including his elected position on the university council, under a confidential settlement reached following complaints that he allegedly directed many of his first-year students to undertake paid tutorials through his wife's company, in return for bonus marks in his courses.

Following his departure from Macquarie University, in late 2006 Malley was appointed chief executive officer of the Urological Society of Australia and New Zealand. Malley left this role in late 2009, when he was appointed CEO of CPA Australia; he remained a director of the Urological Society until November 2015 and on his departure was awarded honorary membership of the society.

=== CPA Australia ===
In 1998, Malley was elected to the NSW divisional council of the professional accounting body, CPA Australia, and in 2000 unsuccessfully applied to be the NSW division's director. However, in 2003 Malley became president of the NSW Division of CPA Australia, and then one of 16 national directors, rising to be vice-president of the CPA Australia board in 2005, and deputy president in 2006. In October 2007 Malley was appointed as the president of CPA Australia. In early 2009, Malley stepped down as president and was succeeded by his former Macquarie University colleague, Professor Richard Petty, and was appointed the CEO of the organisation in July 2009, commencing from 12 October 2009.

As CEO of CPA Australia, Malley came under significant criticism in the media and from CPA members in 2017 for his $1.8 million annual salary and for the significant amounts of CPA funds going towards promoting Malley and his personal interests, such as a paid television show and Malley's book, The Naked CEO. The scandal surrounding Malley, combined with broader member discontent over executive changes that made the board unaccountable and debts accrued from the establishment of a financial planning arm, led to the resignation of the CPA president and two board members by June 2017. The two resigning board members, Richard Alston and Kerry Ryan, cited the presence of "board allies of chief executive Alex Malley" refusing to "allow a wide-ranging review of Mr Malley and the organisation" as their main reason.

On 15 June, a further three directors resigned due to the expanding scandal surrounding Malley and the remaining board initiated an independent review of all claims made against CPA and its CEO, to be chaired by former chief of the Australian Defence Force, Angus Houston. However, even the decision to create the review came under criticism when it was revealed that Houston had appeared as guest on Malley's TV program and had written a glowing foreword in Malley's book. Houston later resigned his post in favour of former Commonwealth Auditor-General, Ian McPhee.

Facing a significant swelling of discontent amongst CPA members, on 23 June 2017 it was announced that the CPA board had terminated the contract of Malley, resulting in CPA paying out the remainder of his contract to the sum of $4.9 million. The subsequent review report released in September 2017 found that the "chief executive was overpaid, [CPA Australia] had lost touch with its members and provided questionable value for money for the services it rendered." In addition to CPA's "over-emphasis on marketing and brand building activities that centred on the former CEO", the review in particular noted the excessive CEO's salary, with its many increases over several years not being justified by organisational growth.

In January 2019, following the recommendations of the 2018 AGM, Malley and three previous directors (Penny Egan, Richard Petty, and Graeme Wade) were stripped of their Life Memberships by the Board for their involvement in the controversy.

=== Australian Chiropractors Association ===
In July 2022, it was revealed that Malley had taken the position of CEO of the Australian Chiropractors Association, which was based at its headquarters in Melbourne. On his appointment, Joe Aston of the Australian Financial Review opined: "The ACA has hired someone even more skilled at manipulation than they are", while the Sydney Morning Herald noted: "Perhaps the back scratchers have short memories ... [Malley is] Proof, if ever, that there’s hope for the cancelled yet."

== Published works ==
- Malley, Alex (2015), The Naked CEO: the truth you need to build a big lie, Milton, Queensland: John Wiley & Sons Australia, ISBN 978-0-7303-1459-2

Professional and academic associations
Preceded by Geoff Rankin	Chief Executive Officer of CPA Australia; 2009–2017	Succeeded by Adam Awty
