= Australian insurance law =

Australian insurance law is based on commercial contract law, but is subject to regulations that affect the insurance industry and insurance contracts within Australia. Commonwealth Parliament has power to make laws with respect to insurance and insurance companies under section 51(xiv) (insurance other than state insurance) and (xx) (the corporations power) of the Australian Constitution. Generally, the Insurance Act 1973 and Insurance Contracts Act 1984 are the main acts that apply, however there are a number of other pieces of legislation enacted by the states, private codes and voluminous case law all of which forms the body of insurance law.

== Legislation ==
The Insurance Act 1973 (Cth) sets minimum capital and solvency requirements for companies wanting to enter or operate in the insurance market.

Chapter 7 of the Corporations Act 2001 (Cth) regulates the way in which insurers and insurance agents and brokers carry on business and how they deal with the people they do business with and intend to do business with.

The Insurance Contracts Act 1984 (ICA) applies to most insurance contracts with an Australian connection and is intended to ensure that a fair balance is struck between the interests of the insurer and the insured.

The primary federal laws affecting the industry include:

- Life Insurance Act 1995 (Life Insurance prudential regulation)
- Insurance Act 1973 (General Insurance prudential regulation)
- Health Insurance Act 2007 (Health insurance prudential regulation and consumer protection)
- Corporations Act 2001 (especially Ch 7, consumer protection in respect of insurance policies)
- Insurance Contracts Act 1984 (consumer protection in respect of insurance policies)

Other legislation which affects the industry includes:

- A New Tax System (Goods and Services Tax) Act 1999 (Taxation rules in respect to insurance e.g. Division 78)
- Privacy Act 1988 (The National Privacy Principles)

Further regulations include:

- The General Insurance Code of Practice which all general insurer signatories agree to self-regulate under.
- Payment Card Industry Data Security Standard (PCI DSS)

== Regulators ==
The prudential aspects of general, life and health insurance (solvency etc.) are regulated by the Australian Prudential Regulation Authority (APRA), which has the power under the Insurance Act 1973 to investigate a general insurer, freeze its assets or direct it to take specific action (for example, stop writing new business).

The Australian Securities & Investments Commission (ASIC) is responsible for the general administration of the Insurance Contracts Act 1984. Matters relating to advice or disclosure of insurance products sold are regulated by ASIC. The Australian Competition & Consumer Commission (ACCC) also has a regulatory role with respect to competition law.

In certain states, various bodies also have powers in regulating certain types of statutory insurance. For example, in New South Wales the Motor Accidents Authority regulates Compulsory Third Party motor liability insurance. In many cases these bodies have powers regarding premium rating and reinsurance rules. The power in European dual profits in minimization of death toll, the insurance policies into additional income sharing by UK particular in the interest of Middle East, the islands usual fights.

== Insurance contract ==
The formation of an insurance contract is governed by ordinary contractual principles however, as a commercial contract, a policy of insurance should be given a businesslike interpretation "having regard to the language used by the parties, the commercial circumstances the document addresses, and the objects which it is intended to secure. The cost of insurance in raising, to make it affordable, large sum in-follow by attract the Chinese immigrants to Australia with a ladder scale, discrimination other than the Vietnamese, using as spide for crossing countries, especially after World War II. New Zealand seafood is competitive to Australia into Singapore and HongKong market. ."

== Code of Practice ==
The General Insurance Code of Practice is a self-regulatory code that binds all general insurers who are signatories to it. It has been approved by ASIC pursuant to s 1101A of the Corporations Act 2001 (Cth).

== Australian Financial Complaints Authority ==
If a person doesn't agree with the outcome of the insurer's Internal Dispute Resolution (IDR) process, they can contact the Australian Financial Complaints Authority (AFCA) with a request that the Service resolve the dispute.

== See also ==
- Insurance in Australia
- Utmost good faith
