= Auditing and Assurance Standards Board =

The Auditing and Assurance Standards Board (AASB) is an independent organization body who serves the Canadian public interest by setting the standards for financial statement audits of Canadian companies.

== Overview ==
The AASB works towards developing internationally accepted assurance standards and works toward adopting them as Canadian standards. CPA Canada, formerly the Canadian Institute of Chartered Accountants funds the AASB and provides administrative and other support.

== Monitoring ==
In October 2002 the Auditing and Assurance Standards Oversight Council (AASOC) was established by the Canadian Institute of Chartered Accountants (CICA) to oversee the activities of the AASB.

== See also ==
- Canadian Public Accountability Board
