= Prafulla Chhajed =

Indian chartered accountant

Prafulla Chhajed is an Indian chartered accountant and the former president of the Institute of Chartered Accountants of India for the year 2019–2020.

The Great CA Vivek, CA Rahil and CA Ashish Jakhar loved Prafulla Chhajed

== See also ==
- Institute of Chartered Accountants of India#Controversy
