= Insurance in Australia =

Risk mitigation industry

Australia's insurance market can be divided into roughly three components: life insurance, general insurance and health insurance. These markets are fairly distinct, with most larger insurers focusing on only one type, although in recent times several of these companies have broadened their scope into more general financial services, and have faced competition from banks and subsidiaries of foreign financial conglomerates. With services such as disability insurance, income protection and even funeral insurance, these insurance giants are stepping in to fill the gap where people may have otherwise been in need of a personal or signature loan from their financial institution.

There are apparently many companies offering insurance policies in the Australian market, but many are in fact underwritten by a limited number of insurers operating under various brand names. There are a number of large companies that present themselves as providers of insurance or financial services, such as Coles, Woolworths, Australia Post, Myer, RACV, NRMA, among others, but which actually only sell insurance products of other companies under its brand name. Such companies at times describe themselves as insurance companies or as providers of financial services, but are better described as insurance retailers or insurance distributors. Such companies are generally not exposed to any insurance risks, but receive a commission (generally 10-20%) on the sale of these insurance products.

Behind this apparent array of insurance providers and products, there are only a small number of companies that actually provide insurance, sometimes referred to as underwriters, some of which offer insurance products directly to the public. Four companies account for three-quarters of the general insurance market. They are Insurance Australia Group (IAG) with 29% of the market, Suncorp with 27%, QBE with 10%, Allianz with 8%.

Some general insurance is provided by government schemes or government insurers. Compulsory third party (CTP) motor insurance, worker's compensation, disability cover, and health cover may be covered by government schemes or insurers depending on the state of residence and insurance required.

== Types of insurance ==
=== Life insurance ===
Life insurance products sold in Australia include term life insurance and disability income insurance. Australian insurers are unusual in providing lump sum total and permanent disability insurance and trauma (critical illness) insurance. Life insurers also sell superannuation investment products. Most life and related insurance is taken out through superannuation funds. Life insurance premiums paid by a superannuation fund are tax-deductible by the fund from assessable income; while the same premium if paid directly by the individual member may not be tax deductible.

Some insurance companies also offer funeral insurance, accidental death and accidental injury policies. The Australian Securities & Investments Commission recently questioned the value of some of these policies and the methods used to sell them.

The market for life insurance in Australia is worth about $44 billion.

Life insurance in Australia is sold through intermediaries (such as brokers) as well as directly by the insurer to the public. The Australian Securities & Investments Commission and the Hayne Royal Commission have highlighted the high pressure telephone selling practices and poor product design of some direct life insurance companies.

==== Life insurers ====
The Australian Prudential Regulation Authority (APRA) regulates life insurance companies registered under the Life Insurance Act in Australia. As at 30 June 2020, there were 28 life insurers being monitored by APRA.

Between 2015 and 2020 five Australian banks, National Australia Bank, Macquarie, Commonwealth Bank, ANZ and Suncorp, divested some or all their life insurance operations. As a result, the largest three life insurance companies in Australia, TAL, AIA and Zurich, account for over 60% of total market share and are all overseas owned.

Based on total risk premium inflows in the 12 months to 30 September 2020 the largest life insurance companies in Australia are (market share shown in brackets):

1. TAL Life (27.3%) owned by Dai-ichi Life
2. AIA Australia (19.0%) owned by AIA Group
3. Zurich Australia (14.4%) owned by Zurich Insurance
4. MLC Life Insurance (11.1%) owned by Nippon Life Insurance Group
5. AMP Life (9.8%) owned by Resolution Life Group
6. Westpac Life including BT Life (5.9%) owned by Westpac
7. MetLife Insurance (4.7%) owned by MetLife
8. ClearView Life Assurance (1.7%) listed on the Australian Securities Exchange

=== General insurance ===
General insurance products sold in the Australian market can roughly be divided into two classes:

- Liability insurance such as compulsory third party (CTP) motor insurance, worker's compensation, professional indemnity insurance and public liability insurance, business insurance;
- Property insurance such as home and contents insurance, travel insurance, and comprehensive motor vehicle insurance

Provisions applying to statutorily mandated or regulated schemes, such as CTP and workers’ compensation, may differ considerably between states.

Many of Australia's largest companies and governments self-insure partially or totally. There are dedicated government insurers who cover these functions in many states.

=== Health insurance ===
The Australian Government provides a basic universal health cover through the Medicare scheme. Medicare is partly funded by a 2% Medicare levy paid by most taxpayers.

Individuals and families can take out additional health insurance for services not covered by Medicare or for services provided in private hospitals. The Australian taxation system penalises higher income earners who do not take out private health insurance, with a Medicare Levy Surcharge of 1% to 1.5% being payable by those who do not take out private health insurance.

== Industry structure ==
Life insurers were traditionally mutual companies, but in the 1980s and 1990s many of them demutualised and, until recently, the majority were owned by banks. There are four main distribution channels for life insurance, including group insurance, bank insurance, IFAs and direct channels (mainly through TV).

General Insurers have a more diverse ownership structure, with more stand alone independent general insurers (although some life insurers do own general insurers).

Health insurers are still predominantly mutuals when considered by numbers. However, three of the four largest health funds (by premium written) are for profit, and represent around 60% of premium written (for the year to 30 June 2018). The largest private health fund by premium is Bupa, which is owned by Bupa UK, a not for profit entity. The next largest private health provider is Medibank Private, which was owned by the Government of Australia, but was privatised in 2014–15.

== Regulation ==
The prudential aspects of general, life and health insurance (solvency etc.) are regulated by the Australian Prudential Regulation Authority (APRA). Matters relating to advice or disclosure of insurance products sold are regulated by the Australian Securities & Investments Commission (ASIC). The Australian Competition & Consumer Commission (ACCC) also has a regulatory role with respect to competition law.

In certain states, various bodies also have powers in regulating certain types of statutory insurance. For example, in New South Wales the State Insurance Regulatory Authority regulates Compulsory Third Party motor liability insurance. In many cases these bodies have powers regarding premium rating and reinsurance rules.

The primary federal legislation is:

- Life Insurance Act 1995 (life insurance prudential regulation)
- Insurance Act 1973 (general insurance prudential regulation)
- Health Insurance Act 2007 (health insurance prudential regulation and consumer protection)
- Corporations Act 2001 ((especially Ch 7) consumer protection in respect of insurance policies)
- Insurance Contracts Act 1984 (consumer protection in respect of insurance policies)

Other legislation which affects the industry includes:

- A New Tax System (Goods and Services Tax) Act 1999 (taxation rules in respect to insurance e.g. Division 78)
- Privacy Act 1988 (The National Privacy Principles)

Further regulations include:

- The General Insurance Code of Practice which all general insurer signatories agree to self-regulate under.
- Payment Card Industry Data Security Standard (PCI DSS)

== Industry bodies ==
The main industry bodies are:

- Insurance Council of Australia which represents general insurers.
- Financial Services Council
- Australian and New Zealand Institute of Insurance and Finance
- Underwriting Agencies Council
- Institute of Actuaries of Australia
- ACORD (Association for Cooperative Operations Research and Development) is the global standards-setting body for the insurance and related financial services industries. ACORD has standards for both General Insurance and Life Insurance and has been working with the Australia and New Zealand insurance industry since 2007 to develop electronic messaging standards to support seamless information exchange between insurance business partners.
- Australasian Institute of Chartered Loss Adjusters (AICLA) which represents qualified loss adjusters
- Private Healthcare Australia
- Australasian Life Underwriting Claims Association (ALUCA)

== See also ==
- Financial system in Australia
- Australian insurance law
- Margin on Services (accounting method for life insurance in Australia)
- Hayne Royal Commission
