= Institute of Financial Accountants =

Professional body for financial accountants

- Established: 1916
- Type: Professional Association
- Professional title: Incorporated Financial Accountant (FFA or AFA)
- Headquarters: London, United Kingdom
- Region served: Worldwide
- Services: Accountancy
- Members: 5599
- Key people: Jonathan Barber (Executive Director – UK)
- Website: www.ifa.org.uk

The Institute of Financial Accountants (IFA) is a professional accountancy body representing and providing certification for financial accountants in the United Kingdom. The IFA is a full member of the International Federation of Accountants.

== History ==
The Institute was founded in 1916.

In 1973, the IFA established the International Association of Book-keepers (IAB) and members of IAB participate in IFA's benevolent fund.

The IFA merged with the Federation of Tax Advisers (FTA) in 2009 and in 2014 with the Institute of Public Accountants of Australia to form the IPA Group; the world's largest SME/SMP professional accountancy body. Members of the IFA obtained membership of the IPA at their equivalent IFA membership grade. As of 2024, the IPA Group has more than 49,000 members and students in 100 countries.

As of 2007, IFA members are recognised by HM Treasury as supervisors under anti-money laundering legislation.

In 2008, the IFA became an associate member of the International Federation of Accountants (IFAC), and a full member in 2011.

On 1 October 2020 the Financial Conduct Authority (FCA) added the Institute of Financial Accountants to the list of bodies whose members can provide a statement of high net worth. This change was confirmed in the Financial Conduct Authority’s Handbook Notice 80 and followed the FCA’s Quarterly Consultation in Consultation Paper 20/4, para 3.26, page 18.

== Membership and certifications ==
As of 2015, membership of the IFA was generally given to applicants completing a period of relevant work experience and passing a series of examinations for the IFA qualification; applicants could also be admitted to membership by way of exemption or by accreditation of prior learning. As of 2019, IFA qualifications are no longer available for new students, but are replaced by studying for the "IFA Direct" programme with CU Coventry. Recognition of prior experience is no longer a route to membership. As of 2021 the "IFA Direct" education programme is delivered in partnership with ATHE.

There are five grades of membership: Intermediate Financial Accountant IFA AIPA, Associate Tax Adviser ATA, Associate Financial Accountant AFA MIPA, Fellow Tax Adviser FTA, and Fellow Financial Accountant FFA FIPA. (In the three compound post-nominal letter groupings above, the second component denotes alignment with membership of the Australian Institute of Public Accountants; with which the IFA had previously merged.)

The IFA was recognised by the Office of Qualifications and Examinations Regulation (Ofqual) from 2011–2020. Ofqual regulates qualifications, examinations and assessments in England and vocational qualifications in Northern Ireland and grants formal recognition to bodies and organisations that deliver qualifications and assessments. In 2020 the IFA surrendered its Ofqual recognition.

The IFA offers a Diploma in IFRS through accredited training providers in Pakistan, Peru, the Russian Federation [currently suspended], Ukraine and Lithuania.

IFA offers various certifications in financial accounting, tax advice, and financial and business management, all in small and medium-sized enterprises.

== University links ==
The IFA works with a number of universities in the UK and internationally to provide a route to membership of the IFA.

== See also ==
- British qualified accountants
