= Association of Accounting Technicians =

Worldwide professional organization

- The Association of Accounting Technicians (AAT)
- Abbreviation: AAT
- Formation: 1980
- Founded at: London, United Kingdom
- Type: Charitable organisation (England and Wales), Awarding Organisation, Professional Body
- Headquarters: London, E14; United Kingdom
- Members: Around 50,000 professional members, 75,000 students
- President: Michael Steed
- Vice-President: Lucy Cohen
- Chief Executive Officer: Sarah Beale
- Website: aat.org.uk

The Association of Accounting Technicians (AAT) is a UK-headquartered, global professional body for accounting technicians and bookkeepers, as well as a major provider of finance and accounting qualifications in the UK.

In 2023, AAT confirmed to the Financial Reporting Council (FRC) that the professional body and qualifications provider had 50,945 professional members and 76,416 students sitting its qualifications in 2022.

AAT is the largest provider of accounting apprenticeships in the UK.

AAT has members living in and students pursuing its qualifications from, more than 100 countries globally.

Beyond the UK, the counties with the highest number of current or previous AAT learners are Botswana, Malaysia and Bahrain.

== Leadership ==
In October 2024, tax lecturer, professional director, and long-running accountancy practice owner, Michael Steed, became AAT's new president. Steed took up the role alongside newly elected AAT Vice-president Lucy Cohen, an accountancy services entrepreneur and former AAT apprentice.

Prior to Steed the organisation's presidency was occupied by change management consultant Kevin Bragg, who first came to AAT's then-Council as an ex-officio appointee representing one of the original sponsoring bodies.

AAT's current chief executive officer (CEO) is Sarah Beale, who was appointed to the role in November 2021.

Beale is a qualified accountant, studying as an AAT trainee in what would be regarded today as an apprenticeship. The CEO joined AAT following a career operating her own businesses, holding a number of finance and leadership roles, and more than a decade at the Construction Industry Training Board (CITB) immediately prior to joining AAT. Beale was appointed interim CEO of CITB, and then CEO in her own right.

== Governance ==
AAT is governed as a charity with public interest requirements, as well as a professional body accountable to its members.

In practice, the organisation is governed by a 20-person trustee board (called the 'AAT Council', with AAT's president serving as the chair of the council for a one-year term. Council members are term-limited to serve a maximum of three three-year terms, effectively nine years.

AAT's current council includes Rachel Harris and Lucy Cohen who contribute as leading figures in the accountancy sector.

== History ==
AAT was created in 1980 by merging the technician-focused divisions of two major UK accounting bodies: the Institute of Accounting Staff (then a subsidiary of ACCA); and the Association of Technicians in Finance and Accounting (then a subsidiary of CIPFA).

From its formation in the 1980s, AAT offered a technician level qualification which was intended to support greater accessibility and availability of accounting and finance career routes (including to chartered status), even for those without existing credentials ('open access').

Exemptions remain available to AAT qualified persons for accessing chartered qualifications despite changes in the legal relationship between the bodies and AAT over time.

In May 2017, AAT members voted to amend the organisation's Articles of Association to remove the sponsoring role of the chartered bodies, present since AAT's inception. The decision also removed the bodies' ex officio seats on AAT's governing body, the AAT Council.

== Charitable Status ==
As a registered charity AAT in England and Wales. It has a remit to act in the public interest. This is done through increasing the availability of accountancy education. AAT's charitable objects are:

1. To advance public education and promote the study of the practice, theory and techniques of accountancy
2. (i) to prevent crime; and (ii) to promote the sound administration of the law for the public benefit by promoting and enforcing standards of professional conduct amongst those engaged in accountancy by monitoring and supervising their compliance with money laundering legislation.

AAT has been an accredited Living Wage Employer since 2016. The organisation is also a Disability Confident employer and is a signatory to both the Race at Work Charter and the Women in Finance Charter. The organisation also reports on its own gender pay gap and ethnicity pay gap.

AAT launched its new strategic plan to 2030, in 2023. The plan is based on three core themes: 'driving up professional standards', 'keeping the profession relevant' and 'building responsible business'.

== Exemptions ==
AAT offers a range of exemptions for international learners, which are listed on its website.

AAT agreed an exemption agreement with the Chartered Tax Institute of Malaysia (CTIM) in June 2024. The agreement means those with a number of CTIM qualifications will no longer have to sit all AAT assessments to gain AAT qualifications, which are Ofqual-recognised and globally respected. The move creates a more direct path for students and members with CTIM local tax qualifications to become AAT qualified accounting technicians.

== Examinations ==
Since 2010, every level of the AAT qualification has a number of modules, each of which culminate in a computer-based assessment. In the case of end-point assessments, which are undertaken by apprentices at the conclusion of their placement, there is also a portfolio element in addition to AAT's online assessment.

== Qualifications and assessments ==
AAT is unique amongst accountancy bodies in that its qualifications are open-access. That is, someone does not need to hold prior qualifications from learning institutions as a prerequisite to enrol in a programme offering AAT Level 1.

Accounting technicians, when certified as being experienced and competently qualified, can perform identical tasks to Chartered accountants with the exception of not being permitted to sign off company audits. This is largely irrelevant for AAT licensed accountants as their client base is almost exclusively formed of micro and small businesses who enjoy the small company audit exemption (employing less than 50 employees with a turnover below £10.1m or assets below £5.1m).

AAT also licenses ATOL reporting accountants although it only has a small number of such members.

In 2014, AAT expanded its suite of qualifications and launched new courses in accounting, bookkeeping, computerised accounting, tax and business skills. In 2017, AAT also launched a new membership category for bookkeepers (AATQB).

AAT launched its Qualifications 2022 suite in September 2022. At the time, the body said its redesigned qualifications would provide students with relevant knowledge covering business ethics, technology, communication and issues related to sustainability.

AAT's qualifications are composed of modules, or units. Each unit covers a specific area of learning required by someone who wants to be an AAT-qualified accountant or bookkeeper. Units conclude with a test called a ‘computer-based assessment’.

For apprentices, their course knowledge, practical skills and behaviour in the workplace is assessed through an end-point assessment. This includes an interview, as well as an online test. AAT allows remote invigilation for selected assessments.

The AAT Intermediate NQF Level 3 qualification (SCQF Level 6 in Scotland) is approved for the university entrance system with a value of up to 56 UCAS tariff points. This is also included in the KS5 performance tables. The final AAT qualification, the AAT Advanced Level is equivalent to QCF Level 4 and SCQF Level 8.

== International ==
AAT has played a global role in advocating for greater recognition of accounting technicians. AAT became a full member of the International Federation of Accountants (IFAC) in 2012 and has since worked with them to develop a framework which outlines the role of an accounting technician in the global accounting profession.

In 2024, CEO Sarah Beale represented AAT as a member of Confederation of Asian and Pacific Accountants (CAPA) and an affiliate member of Association of Financial Advisers (AFA) during council meetings in Malaysia.

== Campaigns ==
AAT's Accountable campaign is focused on lobbying for regulation in the tax profession – the roots of the campaign go back to 2010, when the public position was first announced. Their main ask is that anyone offering professional tax advice should be mandated to have professional body membership so that they can be held to a set of standards in their work and to offer consumers protection from poor advice. The campaign was recognised with a nomination at the Tolley's Tax awards in 2022.

== Publications ==
AAT Comment is a public-facing website where AAT publishes free-to-read pieces online. AAT Comment articles are written to inform and update members about changes to policy, practice and to the accountancy and finance professions more widely.

AT Magazine is published by the body and is available to its members. It was first launched in 1982 as a print publication and transitioned to digital-only in 2024. AT's aim is to equip and inform AAT members in their roles, drive up standards and foster a sense of community, along with supporting AAT priorities.

== Arms ==
Coat of arms of Association of Accounting Technicians

Notes
Granted 15 April 1985 by Garter Cole and Norroy Brooke-Little.
Crest
A talbot sejant Gules gorged with a golden cord pendant therefrom a bezant and supporting with the dexter forefoot a pair of dividers Gold.
Escutcheon
Per saltire Or and Gules two computer ferrite core memory store matrices in pale and two roundels in fess all counterchanged on a chief Gules a balance Or.
Motto
With Integrity And With Diligence
Badge
On a bezant a computer ferrite core memory store matrix Gules.

== See also ==
- British Accountant
