= Accounting in Sri Lanka =

Legal regulations in Sri Lanka

The Accounting in Sri Lanka is regulated under the several legal regulations. There are several professional accountancy body in the country. The Sri Lanka Accounting and Auditing Standards Monitoring Board (SLAASMB) is the audit oversight entity, while the Auditor General of Sri Lanka has audit oversight over government all entities.

== Recognised bodies for restricted work ==
=== Audit of limited companies ===
It is illegal for any individual or firm that is not a Registered Auditor to perform an audit of a Sri Lankan limited company. To become a Registered Auditor, an accountant must hold a practising certificate from a recognised body, demonstrate the necessary professional ability in that area, and submit to regular inspection. The Institute of Chartered Accountants of Sri Lanka (CA Sri Lanka) is the only recognised supervisory body under the Companies Act No. 7 of 2007 authorise their members to carry out company audits.

== Titles of Sri Lankan accountancy qualifications ==
- Chartered Accountants must be members of Institute of Chartered Accountants of Sri Lanka (CA Sri Lanka) (designatory letters ACA or FCA)
- Chartered Management Accountants must be members of the Institute of Certified Management Accountants of Sri Lanka (CMA) (designatory letters ACMA or FCMA)

=== Practising certificates ===
Before engaging in practice (i.e. selling services to the public rather than acting as an employee), an accountant belonging to any of these bodies must gain a 'practising certificate' by meeting further requirements such as purchasing adequate insurance and undergoing inspections.

== Bookkeepers and accounting technicians ==
The Association of Accounting Technicians of Sri Lanka (AAT) (designatory letters MAAT, SAT or FMAAT, standing for "Member of the Association of Accounting Technicians", "Senior Technician Level" or "Fellow Member of the Association of Accounting Technicians", respectively) is the Sri Lankan body offering a qualification at a level between that of 'bookkeeper' and that of the Recognised Qualifying Bodies.

== Regulations ==
Legislation governing accounting and financial reporting;

- Securities and Exchange Commission Act No. 36 of 1987
- Banking Act No. 30 of 1988
- Accounting and Auditing Standards Act No. 15 of 1995
- Companies Act No. 7 of 2007
- Finance Business Act of 2012
- Regulation of Insurance Industry Act No. 27 of 2011
- Inland Revenue Act No. 9 of 2015
- Microfinance Act No. 6 of 2016
- Finance Act No. 38 of 1971
