= International Ethics Standards Board for Accountants =

International body setting ethics standards for accountants

- Abbreviation: IESBA
- Official language: English
- Parent organization: International Foundation for Ethics and Audit (IFEA)
- Website: https://www.ethicsboard.org/

The International Ethics Standards Board for Accountants (IESBA) is an independent global standard-setting board that develops and promotes the International Code of Ethics for Professional Accountants (including International Independence Standards). The Code establishes a principles-based framework of ethical requirements and independence standards for professional accountants and assurance practitioners worldwide. It is adopted, used, or referenced in more than 130 jurisdictions, including 18 of the G20 economies.

Along with the International Auditing and Assurance Standards Board, the IESBA operates within the International Foundation for Ethics and Audit (IFEA), an independent nonprofit organization established in 2023 that supports international standard setting in ethics, audit and assurance in the public interest.

== Organization ==
The IESBA develops its standards independently and in accordance with an established due process and public interest framework. Its standard-setting activities are overseen by the Public Interest Oversight Board (PIOB), which monitors the board’s strategy, work plan and due process to ensure responsiveness to the public interest.

The IESBA operates within the IFEA, a nonprofit organization governed by a Board of Trustees. The Trustees oversee governance and operations and appoint the foundation’s principal officers, including the Chairs of the IESBA and IAASB.

A joint Stakeholder Advisory Council (SAC) provides strategic advice to both the IESBA and IAASB.

IESBA meetings are generally open to the public. Agendas, agenda papers, meeting highlights and recordings, as well as strategy and work plan information, are publicly available on the board’s website.

== Activities ==
The IESBA periodically revises the International Code of Ethics for Professional Accountants (including International Independence Standards) to address developments in business, reporting and assurance.

A revision was issued in 2016, introducing provisions on responding to non-compliance with laws and regulations (NOCLAR). These provisions established requirements for professional accountants who become aware of actual or suspected NOCLAR in the course of their work, making clear that they cannot simply turn a blind eye.

A significant milestone was the 2018 revision and restructuring of the Code, effective June 2019. The revision included clarifications to the conceptual framework, and improvements to usability and structure.

In 2019, the IESBA issued revisions to Part 4B of the Code, which sets out independence requirements for assurance engagements other than audits and reviews.

Since 2020, the IESBA has issued a series of targeted revisions addressing emerging issues, including:

- A revised, globally operable definition of public interest entities (PIEs) (2022).
- Revisions addressing the ethical and independence implications of digitalization, artificial intelligence and data analytics (2023).
- Revisions addressing tax planning and related services (2024).
- Sustainability-related ethics and independence standards applicable to sustainability reporting and assurance engagements (2025).

The IESBA engages with regulators, national standard setters, professional bodies, firms, investors and governance stakeholders to promote adoption and consistent implementation of the Code.

Many professional accountancy organizations that are members of the International Federation of Accountants (IFAC) adopt or align their ethical requirements with the IESBA Code. The Forum of Firms, an association of international networks performing transnational audits, also commits its member networks to policies and methodologies consistent with the Code.

The IESBA publishes non-authoritative materials, including staff questions and answers and guidance, to support implementation.

The IESBA Code

The International Code of Ethics for Professional Accountants (including International Independence Standards) establishes five fundamental principles:

- Integrity
- Objectivity
- Professional Competence and Due Care
- Confidentiality
- Professional Behavior

The Code includes a conceptual framework requiring professional accountants to identify, evaluate and address threats to compliance with these principles. Threats are categorized as self-interest, self-review, advocacy, familiarity and intimidation.

Where threats are not at an acceptable level, professionals are required to eliminate the circumstances creating the threat, apply appropriate safeguards, or decline or end the professional activity.

== International Code of Ethics Structure ==
The following is the full table of contents and sections from the 2025 Handbook of the International Code of Ethics for Professional Accountants.

=== Part 1 – Complying with the Code, Fundamental Principles and Conceptual Framework ===
- 100 Complying with the Code
- 110 The Fundamental Principles
  - 111 – Integrity
  - 112 – Objectivity
  - 113 – Professional Competence and Due Care
  - 114 – Confidentiality
  - 115 – Professional Behavior
- 120 The Conceptual Framework

=== Part 2 – Professional Accountants in Business ===
- 200 Applying the Conceptual Framework – Professional Accountants in Business
- 210 Conflicts of Interest
- 220 Preparation and Presentation of Information
- 230 Acting with Sufficient Expertise
- 240 Financial Interests, Compensation and Incentives Linked to Financial Reporting and Decision Making
- 250 Inducements, Including Gifts and Hospitality
- 260 Responding to Non-compliance with Laws and Regulations
- 270 Pressure to Breach the Fundamental Principles
- 280 Tax Planning Activities

=== Part 3 – Professional Accountants in Public Practice ===
- 300 Applying the Conceptual Framework – Professional Accountants in Public Practice
- 310 Conflicts of Interest
- 320 Professional Appointments
- 321 Second Opinions
- 325 Objectivity of an Engagement Quality Reviewer and Other Appropriate Reviewers
- 330 Fees and Other Types of Remuneration
- 340 Inducements, Including Gifts and Hospitality
- 350 Custody of Client Assets
- 360 Responding to Non-compliance with Laws and Regulations
- 380 Tax Planning Services

=== International Independence Standards ===
==== Part 4A – Independence for Audit and Review Engagements ====
- 400 Applying the Conceptual Framework to Independence for Audit and Review Engagements
- 405 Group Audits
- 410 Fees
- 411 Compensation and Evaluation Policies
- 420 Gifts and Hospitality
- 430 Actual or Threatened Litigation
- 510 Financial Interests
- 511 Loans and Guarantees
- 520 Business Relationships
- 521 Family and Personal Relationships
- 522 Recent Service with an Audit Client
- 523 Serving as a Director or Officer of an Audit Client
- 524 Employment With an Audit Client
- 525 Temporary Personnel Assignments
- 540 Long Association of Personnel (Including Partner Rotation) with an Audit Client
- 600 Provision of Non-Assurance Services to an Audit Client
  - 601 – Accounting and Bookkeeping Services
  - 602 – Administrative Services
  - 603 – Valuation Services
  - 604 – Tax Services
  - 605 – Internal Audit Services
  - 606 – Information Technology Systems Services
  - 607 – Litigation Support Services
  - 608 – Legal Services
  - 609 – Recruiting Services
  - 610 – Corporate Finance Services
- 800 Reports on Special Purpose Financial Statements (Restricted Use)

==== Part 4B – Independence for Assurance Engagements Other than Audit and Review Engagements ====
- 900 Applying the Conceptual Framework to Independence for Assurance Engagements
- 905 Fees
- 906 Gifts and Hospitality
- 907 Actual or Threatened Litigation
- 910 Financial Interests
- 911 Loans and Guarantees
- 920 Business Relationships
- 921 Family and Personal Relationships
- 922 Recent Service with an Assurance Client
- 923 Serving as a Director or Officer of an Assurance Client
- 924 Employment with an Assurance Client
- 940 Long Association of Personnel with an Assurance Client
- 950 Provision of Non-assurance Services to Assurance Clients
- 990 Reports that Include a Restriction on Use and Distribution
