= CPA Australia =

Professional accounting body in Australia

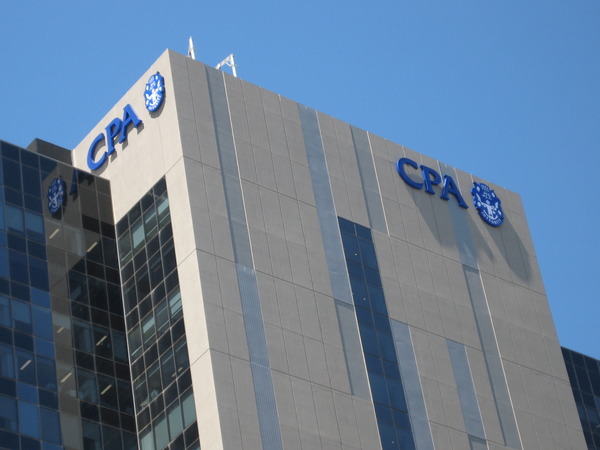
- CPA Australia's head office
- Abbreviation: CPA
- Formation: 12 April 1886; 140 years ago
- Legal status: Registered Body (in Australia)
- Headquarters: 28 Freshwater Place, Southbank, Melbourne, Australia
- Region served: Australia and Asia-Pacific
- Members: 168,736 (2020)
- Official language: English
- President and Chair of the Board: Dale Pinto FCPA
- Chief Executive Officer: Chris Freeland
- Revenue: ▼AUD $156.14 million (2020)
- Expenses: ▼AUD $149.79 million (2020)
- Website: www.cpaaustralia.com.au

CPA Australia ("Certified Practising Accountant") is a professional accounting body in Australia, originally founded as the "Incorporated Institute of Accountants" in 1886. As of 31 December 2020, it has 168,736 members in 150 countries and regions. CPA Australia currently has 19 staffed offices across Australia, China, Hong Kong, Malaysia, Singapore, Indonesia, Vietnam, New Zealand and the UK.

== History ==
The current form of CPA Australia dates from 1952, when the Commonwealth Institute and Federal Institute merged to create the Australian Society of Accountants. In July 1990 the name changed to the Australian Society of Certified Practising Accountants, and in April 2000, the name became CPA Australia.

The main predecessor bodies of the Society, with year of formation, were:

- Incorporated Institute of Accountants, 1886
- Federal Institute of Accountants, 1894
- Association of Accountants of Australia, 1910
- Australasian Institute of Cost Accountants, 1920

=== 2017 CEO controversy ===
The CEO of CPA Australia from 2009, Alex Malley, came under significant criticism in the media and from CPA members in 2017 for his A$1.8 million annual salary and for the significant amounts of CPA funds going towards promoting Malley and his personal interests, such as a paid television show and Malley's autobiography. The scandal surrounding Malley, combined with broader member discontent over executive changes that made the board unaccountable and debts accrued from the establishment of a financial planning arm, led to the resignation of the CPA president Tyrone Carlin in May 2017, and then to two board members resigning a week later in June 2017. The resigning board members, Richard Alston and Kerry Ryan, cited the presence of "board allies of chief executive Alex Malley" refusing to "allow a wide-ranging review of Mr Malley and the organisation" as their main reason. The board resignations had also followed former Future Fund Chairman and Commonwealth Bank CEO, David Murray, who resigned his 40-year CPA membership in response to what he saw as poor management within CPA.

On 15 June, a further three directors resigned due to the expanding scandal surrounding Malley and the remaining board initiated an "independent review" of all claims made against CPA and its CEO, to be chaired by former chief of the Australian Defence Force, Sir Angus Houston. However, even the decision to create the review came under criticism when it was revealed that Houston had appeared as guest on Malley's TV program and had written a glowing foreword in Malley's book. Houston later resigned his post in favour of former Commonwealth Auditor-General, Ian McPhee.

Facing a significant swelling of discontent amongst CPA members, in June 2017 it was announced that the CPA board had terminated the contract of Malley, resulting in CPA paying out the remainder of his contract to the sum of A$4.9 million. On the developing scandal, Sydney Morning Herald journalist Colin Kruger noted: "Accountancy is meant to be the profession of sober financial clarity. [...] Not the sort of profession for flashy types, accountants are meant to be the score keepers, not the goal scorers. It makes the lack of accountability, and financial clarity, from the top accounting body in Australia – CPA Australia – all the more incongruous."

In August 2017, it was announced that the remaining board members would resign their positions at the end of the year, to make way for an entirely new board. The subsequent review report released in September 2017 found that the "chief executive was overpaid, [CPA Australia] had lost touch with its members and provided questionable value for money for the services it rendered." In addition to CPA's "over-emphasis on marketing and brand building activities that centred on the former CEO", the review in particular noted the excessive CEO's salary, with its many increases over several years not being justified by organisational growth. On 1 October 2017 an entirely new board took office, headed by Peter Wilson as president and chairman, and on 3 April 2018 a new CEO, Andrew Hunter, was appointed to take over from the interim CEO since Malley's departure, Adam Awty. In January 2019, following the recommendations of the 2018 AGM, Malley and three previous directors (Penny Egan, former president Richard Petty, and Graeme Wade) were stripped of their Life Memberships by the Board for their involvement in the controversy.

In March 2024, CPA announced Chris Freeland as its new CEO.

== Membership ==
Full members of CPA Australia use the designatory letters CPA, while senior members with at least 15 years' experience in finance, accounting or business, as well as leadership and/or management experience in those fields, may become Fellows and use the letters FCPA. The board may also confer life membership or honorary membership for "eminent achievement and service" to CPA Australia and/or the profession. In 2017, CPA Australia disclosed that the organisation had (as of 30 June 2017) 158,311 members, including 119,653 voting members. The membership at this time comprised 106,299 CPAs, 13,154 FCPAs, and 38,838 associate members.

== International Presence ==
CPA Australia has over 47,000 members outside Australia and New Zealand.

=== Malaysia ===
At the end of 2020, there were 10,484 members in Malaysia.

=== Singapore ===
At the end of 2020, there were 8,603 members in Singapore.

=== China ===
At the end of 2020, there were 19,984 members in China, including Hong Kong.

== Coat ==
Coat of arms of CPA Australia
Notes Granted to the Australian Society of Accountants by the Kings of Arms. Adopted 1 September 1958 Crest On a Wreath of the colors, five books erect proper. Helm A closed steel helmet. Escutcheon Azure, a Fess enhanced and in base a Pale Argent, over all a representation of the Southern Cross counterchanged. Other elements Mantling of azure doubled argent. Symbolism The T formed by the fess and pale represents a double-sided account, and thus double entry book-keeping.

== See also ==
- Chartered Accountants Australia and New Zealand
- International Qualification Examination
- International Federation of Accountants
