= Nigerian Accounting Association =

- Type: Professional association
- Headquarters: Lagos, Nigeria
- Official language: English
- President: Prof. Suleiman A.S. Aruwa→

The Nigerian Accounting Association (NAA) is a member driven association of academics in the accountancy profession. It is the successor to the defunct Nigerian Association of Accounting Teachers (NATA). NATA was established in 1972 with the objective of "contributing through research and education, to the improvement of accounting profession and accounting education in Nigeria". The NAA is an academic society aimed at advancement of the accounting discipline and accounting profession in Nigeria. Members are usually members of the Association of National Accountants of Nigeria (ANAN) and/or the Institute of Chartered Accountants of Nigeria (ICAN).

NAA is a member of the Financial Reporting Council of Nigeria. As of 2011, Dr. Muhammad Mainoma was President of the NAA. Prof. Suleiman A.S. Aruwa is the current president of the association. Prof. Suleiman A.S. Aruwa also serves as the NAA contact person on the International Association for Accounting Education & Research (IAAER).
