= Shuaibu =

Shuaibu can be a given name, a middle name, or a surname. Notable people with the name include:

== Given name ==
- Shuaibu Adamu Ahmed, Nigerian government official
- Shuaibu Amodu (1958–2016), Nigerian footballer
- Shuaibu Audu, Nigerian politician and banker
- Shuaibu Babas (died 2025), Nigerian politician
- Shuaibu Ibrahim (born 1996), Nigerian footballer
- Shuaibu Ibrahim (Army) (born 1967), Nigerian Army general
- Shuaibu Isa Lau (born 1960), Nigerian politician
- Shuaibu Jauro Yahya, Nigerian professor and physician
- Shuaibu Salisu, Nigerian politician

== Middle name ==
- Abdulrahman Shuaibu Abubakar, Nigerian politician

== Surname ==
- Habibu Idris Shuaibu, Nigerian politician
- Lawali Shuaibu, Nigerian politician
