= Financial Reporting Council of Nigeria =

- Abbreviation: FRC
- Predecessor: Nigeria Accounting Standards Board
- Formation: 1982
- Type: Regulatory body
- Legal status: Active
- Purpose: Set standards for accountancy in Nigeria
- Headquarters: Lagos, Nigeria
- Official language: English
- Executive Secretary: Shuaibu Adamu Ahmed
- Parent organization: Federal Ministry of Industry, Trade and Investment
- Website: http://www.financialreportingcouncil.gov.ng/

The Financial Reporting Council (FRC) of Nigeria, formerly the Nigerian Accounting Standards Board (NASB), is an organization charged with setting accounting standards in Nigeria. On Thursday, 6 May 2021, Shuaibu Adamu Ahmed was inaugurated by the Minister of Industry, Trade and Investment, Adeniyi Adebayo, as the Executive Secretary/Chief Executive Officer of FRC.

== Nigerian Accounting Standards Board (NASB) ==
NASB was established in 1982 as a private sector initiative closely associated with the Institute of Chartered Accountants of Nigeria (ICAN). NASB became a government agency in 1992, reporting to the Federal Minister of Commerce. The Nigerian Accounting Standards Board Act of 2003 provided the legal framework under which NASB set accounting standards. Membership includes representatives of government and other interest groups. Both ICAN and the Association of National Accountants of Nigeria (ANAN) each nominate two members to the board.

The primary functions as defined in the act of 10 July 2003 were to develop, publish and update Statements of Accounting Standards to be followed by companies when they prepare their financial statement, and to promote and enforce compliance with the standards. IASB had published many of the earlier standards prepared by the International Accounting Standards Committee and its successor the International Accounting Standards Board, but was more involved in enforcement than in updating to the more modern International Financial Reporting Standards (IFRS).

A 2010 report commissioned by the International Monetary Fund said that the NASB did not have adequate funding to achieve its statutory role. NASB urgently needed to hire new staff, retrain existing staff and offer more attractive pay. In June 2010 Mr. Godson Nnadi, Executive Secretary of Nigeria Accounting Standards Board, spoke in favour of a new body to set accounting and auditing standards for Nigeria and other African nations. The new body would be independent of both ANAN and ICAN. As well as ensuring consistency between countries, costs to each country would be lower due to sharing of the effort.

== Financial Reporting Council ==
On 18 May 2011, the Senate passed the Financial Reporting Council of Nigeria Bill, which repealed the Nigerian Accounting Standards Board Act and replaced it with a new set of rules. The decision was in line with a report submitted by Senator Ahmed Makarfi, Chairman of the Senate committee on Finance. The Executive Secretary of NASB, Jim Osayande Obazee, had strongly supported this bill, which he said would align Nigeria with other countries and improve investor confidence. In June 2011, the Governor of the Central Bank of Nigeria, Sanusi Lamido Sanusi, spoke at a fundraising dinner organized by the NASB for the IFRS academy. Sanusi said that the move to adopt the IFRS would help attract foreign direct investments to Nigeria. At the same event, the NASB Chairman, Michael Adebisi Popoola, called for the abrogation of regulations and laws that are incompatible with IFRS.

The Financial Reporting Council Bill was signed into law on 20 July 2011. According to Olusegun Aganga, minister of Industry, Trade and Investment, "More meaningful and decision enhancing information can now be arrived at from financial statements issued in Nigeria because accounting, actuarial, valuation and auditing standards, used in the preparation of these statements, shall be issued and regulated by this Financial Reporting Council. The FRC is a unified independent regulatory body for accounting, auditing, actuarial, valuation and corporate governance. As such, compliance monitoring in these areas will hence be addressed from the platform of professionalism and legislation".

== Membership ==
Membership includes:

- Central Bank of Nigeria
- Corporate Affairs Commission
- Federal Inland Revenue Service
- Federal Ministry of Commerce
- Federal Ministry of Finance
- Auditor-General for the Federation
- Accountant-General of the Federation
- Securities and Exchange Commission
- Nigerian Accounting Association
- Nigerian Association of Chambers of Commerce, Industry, Mines and Agriculture
- Nigeria Deposit Insurance Corporation
- Institute of Chartered Accountants of Nigeria
- Nigerian Institution of Estate Surveyors and Valuers
- Association of National Accountants of Nigeria
- Chartered Institute of Taxation of Nigeria
- Chartered Institute of Stock Brokers
- Nigeria Stock Exchange
- National Insurance Commission
- National Pension Commission
- Nigerian Bar Association
