= Shaakaa Chira =

Nigerian public servant

Auditor-General for the Federation
- Incumbent
- Assumed office 20 October 2023
- Preceded by: Adolphus Aghughu

Director of Audit
- In office 12 September 2022 – 20 October 2023

Personal details
- Born: Shaakaa Kanyitor Chira; 12 February 1968 (age 58) Donga, Taraba State
- Education: Nasarawa State University, Modibbo Adama Federal University of Technology, Yola
- Occupation: Public servant

Shaakaa Kanyitor Chira FCNA, FCCrFA, FCCFI, ACTI. (born 12 February 1968 in Taraba State, Nigeria) is a Nigerian public servant who has served as the Auditor General for the Federation since 2023.

== Early life and education ==
Shaakaa Chira was born on 12 February 1968 in Donga. He holds a Master of Science (MSc) Degree in Public Sector Accounting from Nasarawa State University and also a Master in Business Administration (MBA) from Modibbo Adama Federal University of Technology, Yola.

Shaakaa is a Fellow of the Association of National Accountants of Nigeria (FCNA), a member of the Chartered Institute of Taxation of Nigeria (ACTI) and also a member of the Computer Forensics Institute of Nigeria (MCFI).

== Professional career ==
He began his working career in 1993 as Accountant II in the Office of the Accountant-General, Taraba State.

He was previously a Director of Audit (DA), Programme and Performance Audit at the Office of the Auditor-General for the Federation (OAuGF). Before then, he also served as Deputy Director (DD) for both the Federal Capital Territory/Area Council (FCT/AC) Audit Departments.

He was Assistant Director (AD) for the Legislative Audit Department at the National Assembly (NASS) and also Chief Auditor at the OAuGF from 2012-2015.

He went on to hold some major positions within the public audit sector; he was the Director of Audit for Programme and Performance Audit Department. Before then, he also served as deputy director of Audit for both the Federal Capital Territory/Area Council (FCT/AC) Audit Department in Abuja as well as the Programme and Performance Audit Department. He was also the assistant director of Audit for the Legislative Audit Department at the National Assembly.

On October 20, 2023, President Bola Tinubu appointed Shaakaa, Auditor General for the Federation and he was confirmed by the Senate on November 1, 2023.
