= List of bar associations in Africa =

This List of bar associations in Africa includes bar associations in countries in Africa, many of which were members of the International Bar Association as of 2017. The East Africa Law Society includes many individual members plus six national Bar associations: Law Society of Kenya, Tanganyika Law Society, Uganda Law Society, Zanzibar Law Society, Kigali Bar Association and Burundi Bar Association.

Country	Association	Website
Algeria	Union Nationale des Ordres des Avocats (الاتحاد الوطني لمنظمات المحامين)	www.unoa.dz
Angola	Angola Bar Association (Ordem dos Advogados de Angola)	www.oaang2.org
Benin	Ordre des Avocats du Benin	barreaudubenin.bj
Botswana	The Law Society of Botswana	www.lawsociety.org.bw
Burkina Faso	Ordre des Avocats du Burkina-Faso	www.barreau.bf
Burundi	Burundi Bar Association (Ordre des Avocats de Bujumbura)	www.bba.bi
Burundi	Ordre des Avocats près de la Cour d’Appel de Gitega	www.gitega-bar.org
Cameroon	Cameroon Bar Association (Ordre des Avocats au Barreau du Cameroun)	barreaucameroun.org
Cape Verde	Ordem dos Advogados de Cabo Verde	www.oacv.cv
Chad	Ordre National des Avocats du Tchad	barreaudutchad.org
Democratic Republic of Congo	Ordre National des Avocats RDC	ona-rdc.org
Republic of the Congo	Ordre National des Avocats du Congo	
Egypt	Egyptian Bar Association	egyls.com
Equatorial Guinea	Colegio de Abogados de Guinea Ecuatorial	
Eswathini	The Law Society of Swaziland	
Ethiopia	Ethiopian Federal Bar Association (የኢትዮጵያ ፌደራል ጠበቆች ማኅበር)	
Gabon	Ordre des Avocats du Gabon	
The Gambia	Gambia Bar Association	gba.gm
Ghana	Ghana Bar Association	ghanabar.org
Guinea	Ordre des Avocats de Guinée	
Guinea-Bissau	Ordem dos Advogados da Guiné Bissau	
Ivory Coast	Barreau de Côte d'Ivoire	web.ordredesavocats.ci
Kenya	International Federation of Women Lawyers (FIDA)	www.fidafederation.org
Kenya	Law Society of Kenya	www.lsk.or.ke
Lesotho	Law Society of Lesotho	lawsociety.org.ls
Liberia	Association of Female Lawyers of Liberia (AFELL)	
Liberia	Liberian National Bar Association	www.lnba.org.lr
Madagascar	Ordre des Avocats du Barreau de Madagascar	www.barreau-de-madagascar.org
Malawi	Malawi Law Society	malawilawsociety.net
Mali	Mali Bar Association (Barreau du Mali)	barreaumali.org
Mauritania	Ordre National des Avocats Mauritaniens (الهيئة الوطنية للمحامين الموريتانيين)	www.onamauritanie.mr
Mauritius	Mauritius Bar Association	www.mauritiusbarassociation.com
Mauritius	The Mauritius Law Society	www.lawsociety.mu
Morocco	Association des Barreaux du Maroc (جمعية هيئات المحامين بالمغرب )	www.abam.ma
Mozambique	Ordem dos Advogados de Moçambique (Mozambique Bar Association)	oam.org.mz
Namibia	Law Society of Namibia	www.lawsocietynamibia.org
Namibia	Society of Advocates of Namibia	www.namibianbar.org
Niger	Ordre des Avocats du Niger	barreauduniger.ne
Nigeria	Nigerian Bar Association	www.nigerianbar.org.ng
Nigeria	Nigerian Law Society	nls.org.ng
Rwanda	Rwanda Bar Association	www.rwandabar.org.rw
São Tomé e Príncipe	Ordem dos Advogados de São Tomé e Príncipe	www.oastp.st
Senegal	Ordre des Avocats du Sénégal	www.ordredesavocats.sn
Seychelles	Bar Association of Seychelles	
Sierra Leone	Sierra Leone Bar Association	
Sierra Leone	The Lawyers’ Society of Sierra Leone	www.lawyerssocietysl.org
South Africa	Law Society of South Africa	www.lssa.org.za
South Africa	General Council of the Bar of South Africa	gcbsa.co.za
South Africa	National Bar Council of South Africa	nationalbarcouncil.co.za
South Africa	South African Bar Association	www.nationalbar.co.za
South Sudan	South Sudan Bar Association	
Sudan	Darfur Bar Association	
Tanzania	Tanganyika Law Society	www.tls.or.tz
Tanzania	Zanzibar Law Society	www.zls.or.tz
Togo	Ordre des Avocats du Togo	www.barreaudutogo.tg
Tunisia	Tunisian Order of Lawyers	avocat.org.tn
Uganda	Uganda Law Society	www.uls.or.ug
Zambia	The Law Association of Zambia	www.laz.org.zm
Zimbabwe	Law Society of Zimbabwe	www.lawsociety.org.zw
