= Sid Gray =

Australian english professor

Sidney John Gray PhD FASSA FCCA CPA MCMI (born 1942) is an English professor emeritus of international business at the University of Sydney Business School, was president of the International Association for Accounting Education and Research (1992–97), a member of the Accounting Standards Committee (ASC) for the UK and Ireland (1984–87) and is recognised "as one of the world's leading scholars in international accounting". Gray has been a visiting professor in many universities around the world including the University of Amsterdam, Stockholm School of Economics, Kyushu University, University of Hong Kong, Waseda University, National University of Singapore, University of Malaya, University of Hawaii and Kwansei Gakuin University in Japan.

== Early life ==
Sidney John Gray was born in 1942 and educated at Bedford Modern School, the University of Sydney (BEc. Hons) and the University of Lancaster (PhD).

During his early years, Gray was a keen sportsman, playing water polo for the Otter Swimming Club in London and swimming butterfly for the Hertfordshire and Berkshire combined team in a southern counties tournament in England. He played rugby union at scrum-half for a number of clubs including Mosman Rugby Club (first grade) in Australia and Lancaster University (1st XV) in England.

== Career ==
Gray was professor of International Business at the Warwick Business School in England (1993–97), professor of Accounting and Finance at the University of Glasgow in Scotland (1980–87) and later Founder Director of the Centre for International Finance and Accounting at the University of Glasgow (1988–92).

In 1997, Gray moved to Australia where he was Foundation Professor of International Business in the Faculty of Commerce and Economics at the University of New South Wales (1997–2003) before taking up his current position at the University of Sydney. He was made professor emeritus at the University of Sydney in 2020.

Gray's main academic interests are in the areas of international accounting, corporate transparency, international business strategy and cross-cultural management.

Gray is a co-founder and associate editor of the Journal of International Financial Management and Accounting (USA) and a member of the editorial boards of international business journals, including Journal of International Business Studies and Management International Review. He was president of the International Association for Accounting Education and Research (1992–97) and a member of the Accounting Standards Committee for the UK and Ireland (1984–87), the peak standard setting body for accounting standards and policies. He is a co-founder of the Australia and New Zealand International Business Academy and its President (2002–04). He was also co-founder of the Australia and New Zealand Chapter of AIB.

During his career, Gray has also been a visiting professor in many universities around the world, including the University of Amsterdam, Stockholm School of Economics, Kyushu University, University of Hong Kong, Waseda University, National University of Singapore, University of Malaya, University of Hawaii and Kwansei Gakuin University in Japan.

== Awards ==
In 1994, Gray was the winner of the American Accounting Association’s International Section award for Outstanding International Accounting Educator. In 2006 he was elected a Fellow of the Academy of the Social Sciences in Australia for distinction in accounting research.

In 2009 Gray was made a Fellow of the Academy of International Business and in 2012 was conferred with the honorary degree of Doctor of Laws by Kwansei Gakuin University in Japan for his contribution to the advancement of culture and international accounting. He was elected a Fellow of the Australian and New Zealand International Business Academy (ANZIBA) in 2019.

== Selected bibliography ==
- Gray SJ and Kang: Accounting Transparency and International Standard-Setting in The Oxford Handbook of Economic and Institutional Transparency, ed. J Forssbaeck and L Oxelheim, Oxford University Press, Oxford, United Kingdom, pp. 456–76 (2015)
- Gray SJ, Coenenberg A and Gordon P: International Group Accounting (RLE Accounting): Issues in European Harmonization, Routledge, Abingdon, United Kingdom (2014)
- Dowling PJ, Liesch P, Gray SJ and Hill CWL: International Business: Asia-Pacific Edition, McGraw-Hill Australia, Sydney, Australia (2009)
- Holt J, Purcell WR, Gray SJ and Pedersen T: Decision Factors Influencing MNEs' Regional Headquarters Location Selection Strategies in Thought Leadership in Advancing International Business Research, ed. A.Y.Lewin, S.Tamer Cavusgil, G.Tomas M. Hult and D.A.Griffith, Palgrave MacMillan, Houndsmill, Basingstoke, Hampshire, United Kingdom, pp. 104–33 (2008)
- Radebaugh L, Gray SJ and Black E: International Accounting and Multinational Enterprises, John Wiley and Sons Ltd, pp. 520 (2006)
- Adams C, Frost G and Gray SJ: Corporate environmental and social reporting in International Finance and Accounting Handbook, ed. Frederick Choi, John Wiley & Sons, Inc., Sydney, Australia, pp. 1–23 (2003)
- Radebaugh L and Gray SJ: International accounting and multinational enterprises, John Wiley, United States, pp. 459 (2002)
- Gray SJ, Radebaugh L and Salter S: Global accounting & control: A managerial emphasis, John Wiley, United States, pp. 224 (2001)
- Gray SJ and Needles B: Financial accounting: A global approach, Houghton, Mifflin, United States, pp. 599 (1999)
- Gray SJ and Brennan N: Voluntary disclosure of profit forecasts: Factors influencing information disclosed during the UK takeover bids in Rechnungswesen als instrument fur fuhrungseutscheidungen (Accounting as an instrument for management's decisions), ed. H.P. Moller and F. Schmidt, Schaffer-Poeschel Verlag, pp. 447–475 (1998)
