= Akerele =

Akerele is a surname. Notable people with the surname include:

- Dorothy Akerele (1913–2007), British-Nigerian musician and hostess, wife of Oni
- Olubanke King Akerele (born 1946), Liberian politician and diplomat
- Oni Akerele (died 1983), Nigerian medical doctor
