= Flaviana Charles =

Tanzanian human rights expert and lawyer

- Citizenship: Tanzanian
- Education: LLB from University of Dar es Salaam – 2002; Master’s (International Law and Human Rights) from Coventry University – 2010; Postgraduate in Law, Mediation and Arbitration
- Occupation: Lawyer
- Organization(s): Business and Human Rights Tanzania

Flaviana Bahati Charles is a Tanzanian lawyer and the executive director of Business and Human Rights Tanzania (BHRT). She is also an active member of the African Union's Network of African Women in Conflict Prevention and Mediation (FemWise-Africa). Charles serves as the Chairperson of the Coalition of Women Human Rights Defenders in Tanzania, and is the Secretary General of the African Bar Association (AFBA), which is the association of lawyers in Africa.

== Early life ==
Flaviana Charles grew up in Mtandika, Tanzania,[2] a large village 400 kilometres (250 mi) west of Dar es Salaam and 100 kilometres (62 mi) east of Iringa, the district capital. She attended primary and secondary school in the village, before studying for a degree at the University of Dar es Salaam. In 2002, Charles earned her Bachelor of Laws (LLB) from the University of Dar es Salaam. She went on to earn her master's degree in International Law and Human Rights in 2010 at Coventry University in England.[1][2]

== Career ==
After graduating, Charles went on to become a program officer at the Legal and Human Rights Centre in Tanzania, where she co-authored publications about gender equity in the extractive sector, community rights in investment, corporate social responsibility, and the right to a clean, healthy, and safe environment. Charles joined numerous organizations centered around law and human rights, including the Tanganyika Law Society (Continuing Legal Education Committee), East African Law Society, African Coalition for Corporate Accountability, Tanzania Women Lawyers Association, and Tanzania Human Rights Defenders Association. Additionally, Charles lectures at the University of Bagamoyo and the Law School of Tanzania, focusing on gender equity, community investment rights, right to clean, and corporate social responsibility.

Charles was formerly President of the public speaking and leadership-oriented Toastmasters Club, Tanzania branch, and Vice President of the Tanganyika Law Society (TLS), a bar association.

Charles is currently the chairperson of the Coalition of Women Human Rights in Tanzania, and the Secretary General of the African Bar Association (AFBA). She is an editor on the Developments in the Field Panel of the Business and Human Rights Journal at the Cambridge University Press.

Charles has commented on the impacts of oil and gas development on women and poor local communities, and the negligence of current legal frameworks that reinforce gender disparities.
