= Kofoworola Bucknor =

Nigerian politician (born 1939)

Deputy Governor of Lagos State
- In office 29 May 1999 – 16 December 2002
- Governor: Bola Tinubu
- Preceded by: Sinatu Ojikutu
- Succeeded by: Femi Pedro

Senator for Lagos Central
- In office 5 December 1992 – 17 November 1993
- Succeeded by: Tokunbo Afikuyomi (1999)

Personal details
- Born: Kofoworola Akerele; 30 April 1939 (age 87) Lagos, British Nigeria (now Lagos, Lagos State, Nigeria)
- Party: Peoples Democratic Party
- Parent: Oni Akerele (Father) Dorothy Akerele (Mother)
- Education: University of Surrey

Kofoworola Bucknor (née Akerele) (born 30 April 1939) is a Nigerian politician and a former deputy governor of Lagos State. She was the deputy governor to Bola Tinubu from 1999 to 2002.

== Early life ==
Kofoworola Akerele was born on 30 April 1939, to Oni Akerele, a prominent Nigerian activists and the first indigenous surgeon in Nigeria. She attended CMS Girls School Lagos before she travelled in 1949 to Surrey England for her Degree in Law. Kofoworola attendded St. Teresa's College, Ibadan, and later Cheltenham Ladies, College in England.

== Career ==
She got a diploma in Journalism in 1962, and worked as a freelance journalist for BBC and VON Magazine. She became the deputy governor of Lagos State when Bola Tinubu became governor on 29 May 1999.

Akerele served as a member of the Nigerian Constituent Assembly from 1977 to 1978 where she contributed to shaping the country's governance framework. She was also elected Senator representing Lagos Central, earning a reputation as a fearless voice of justice, accountability and democratic values in the Third Republic.
