= Nigerian Law Society =

- Abbreviation: NLS
- Formation: 2022; 4 years ago
- Headquarters: Abuja, FCT, Nigeria
- Chairman: Chief Bolaji Ayorinde, OFR, SAN
- President: Mela Audu Nunghe, SAN
- Website: nls.org.ng

The Nigerian Law Society (NLS) is a professional association for legal practitioners in Nigeria. The NLS is a society of lawyers enrolled as barristers and solicitors of the Supreme Court under the Legal Practitioners Act of the country. A council of elected representatives from different parts of the country leads the NLS. It was established in October 2022. Mela Audu Nunghe, SAN, who is former Commissioner for Special Duties in Gombe State and first indigene of the state to become a Senior Advocate of Nigeria is the President of the NLS.

== History ==
The Nigerian Law Society was registered as the Law Society of Nigeria (LSN) in December 1994, as dated in its registration document. The official launch was in October 2022. The society was established in a bid to redefine the ideas of the founding fathers of the legal profession. The first president of the NLS was Kunle Ogunba, SAN, who was replaced in July 2024 by Mela Audu Nunghe, SAN.

== Controversies ==
In early August 2024, the corporate affairs commission (CAC) stated that the Nigerian Law Society is not registered with the commission even though the NLS has applied for registration. The publication by the CAC led to a defamatory suit in the tune of 5 billion naira by the NLS on Hussaini Ishaq Magaji, the registrar general of the (CAC). The NLS filed this suit since a federal high court sitting in Abuja had approved the registration of the NLS in January 2024. The Corporate affairs commission (CAC) requested the prosecution of the NLS from the attorney general of Nigeria, Lateef Fagbemi. The NLS in response, reported Hussaini Ishaq Magaji to President Bola Tinubu over alleged rights violation.
The vice president of the NLS, Nimi Walson-Jack was revoked of his privileges as the general secretary of the Nigerian Bar Association because of his association with the NLS.
