= Office of the Auditor General for the Federation (Nigeria) =

Constitutional Body overview
- Formed: 1910
- Jurisdiction: Federal Government of Nigeria
- Headquarters: Abuja, Nigeria
- Constitutional Body executive: Adolphus Aghughu, Auditor General for the Federation
- Website: oaugf.ng

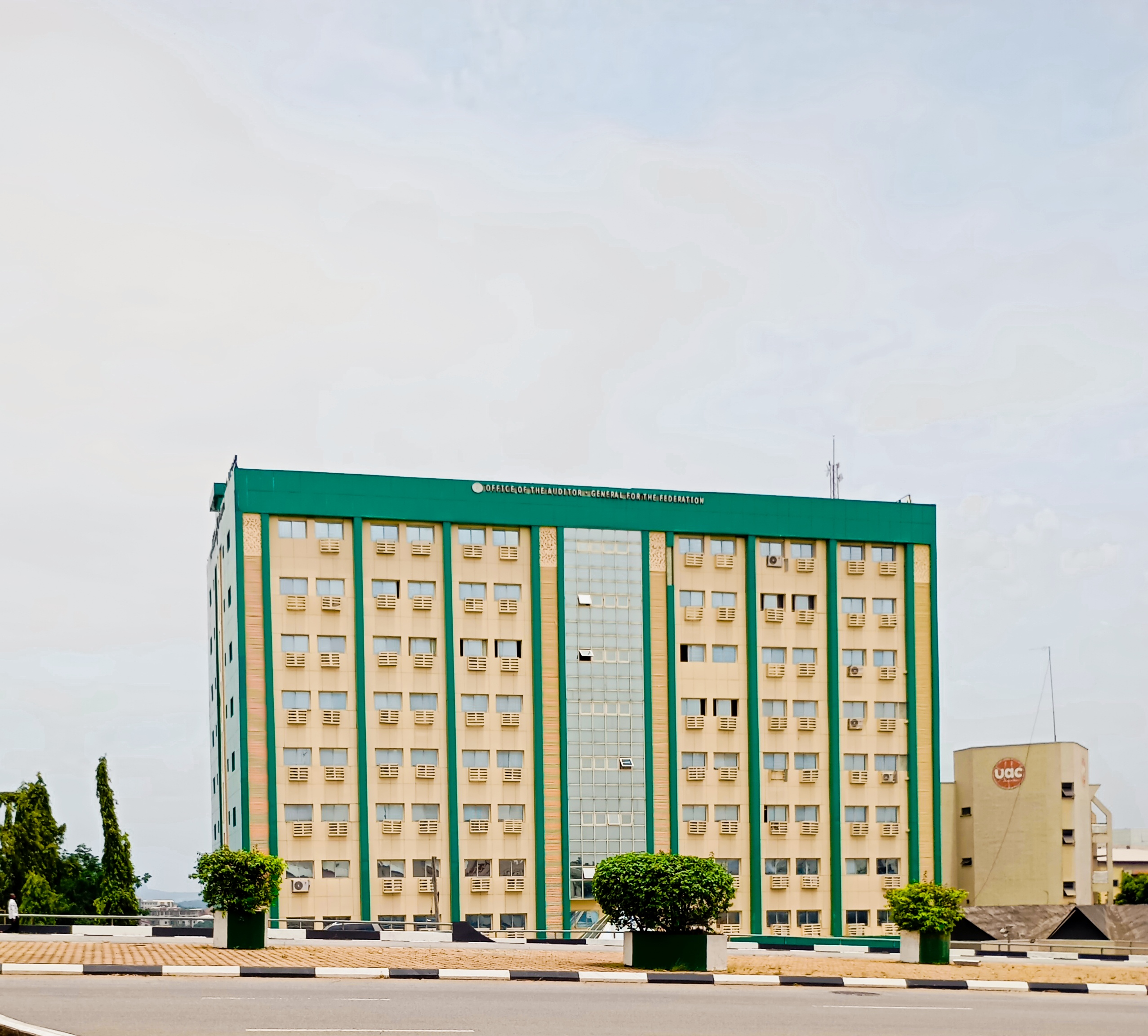
Headquarters

Office of the Auditor General for the Federation (OAuGF) is a constitutional body and the Supreme Audit Institution of Nigeria.

It derives its mandate from the 1999 Constitution of the Federal Republic of Nigeria, as amended (Sections 85 and 86).

The Auditor-General is empowered to undertake audits of all income and expenditure of the Federal Government of Nigeria. However, the Constitution prohibits the Auditor-General from auditing the accounts of “government statutory corporations, commissions, authorities, agencies, including all persons and bodies established by an Act of the National Assembly.” As a result, the Office of the Auditor-General for the Federation cannot audit the financial statements of parastatal organizations, although it can undertake periodic checks in such state-owned entities. The meaning of periodic checks in the context of the Constitution has not been properly defined since no accounting /auditing book has ever defined what a periodic check represents.

The mandate of the Office of the Auditor-General for the Federation is also restricted to the audit of Federal bodies. Each of the 36 states of Nigeria has two Auditors-General, one for the audit of state institutions and the other for the audit of local governments within the state. In total, there are 73 Auditors-General in Nigeria, more than the whole of the rest of Africa put together. However, nothing in the present legislation precludes the Auditor General for the Federation from tracing Federal public monies to any state of the Federation.

== Auditor General ==
According to mandatory written and oral interviews set out for the position by the Nigerian Civil Service, the Auditor General for the Federation is appointed by the President. The current Auditor General, Adolphus Aghughu, was appointed as acting Auditor General on 26 October 2020 before being appointed on a permanent basis on 26 January 2021. He was confirmed by the Senate on 17 February 2021.

== 2021 Expenses controversy ==
In September 2021, the House of Representatives Committee on Public Accounts directed the OAuGF to turn in all relevant documents on the expenses it incurred from 2019 to 2021. This directive came after the committee found that the office had spent billions of naira in "reckless" expenses despite nationwide budget issues during the COVID-19 pandemic. Some of the questionable expenses include ₦3.9 million spent on drugs & medical supplies and ₦7.721 million spent on medical consulting despite ₦55.933 million being spent on the National Health Insurance Scheme along with over ₦500 million spent on transport despite the COVID-19 pandemic preventing most travel. A member of the committee, Ogunlola Olubunmi, asked Auditor General Adolphus Aghughu 'who audits the OAuGF', with Aghughu responding that it was the National Assembly that would found such an office along with disputing that the spending was "reckless."

== See also ==
- Houses of assembly of Nigerian states
- National Bureau of Statistics, Nigeria
- International Organization of Supreme Audit Institutions
