= Nigerian College of Accountancy =

- Other names: NCA
- Type: Private
- Established: 1994; 32 years ago
- Affiliations: International Association for Accounting Education and Research
- Director-General: Dr. Friday E. Akpan PhD, FCNA
- Students: 3,300 (2008)
- Location: Jos, Nigeria
- Website: anancollege.org.ng

Nigerian College of Accountancy (NCA), is a Nigerian educational accountancy institution based in the city of Jos. It was established in 1994 and is operated by Association of National Accountants of Nigeria (ANAN).

NCA is the training arm of ANAN, following International Federation of Accountants standards and pronouncements in training. It is a University member of the International Association for Accounting Education and Research (IAAER).

Accountancy graduates with a B.Sc. or Higher National Diploma from Nigerian Universities and Polytechnics qualify for admission to a three-year training program at the Nigerian College of Accountancy. On successful completion of the examinations they earn the designation of Certified National Accountant and qualify to join ANAN.

== History ==
The College opened in 1994 at Barkin Ladi in Plateau State, admitting ten students for the 1985/1995 academic year. Student numbers were low in the following years, and the college closed down temporarily in 1988. ANAN was chartered in 1993 and the College reopened with 54 students for the 1994/1995 year. The Nigerian College of Accountancy was the first of its kind to be established by a body of accountants anywhere in Africa.

As of 2011 the college was located at temporary premises in the Dogon-Dutse, College of Accountancy Road, Kwall-Near Jos.

It was re-opened for academic and professional work in the 1994/95 session with 54 students; 1995/96 session had 142 students and 1996/97 session had 138 students, in 1999/2000 206 students, and in the 2000/2001 session 384 students, 2001/2002 session 656 students, 2002/2003 session 821 students, 2003/2004 session 1,288 students, 2004/2005 session 1,377 students, 2005/2006 session 2,277 students, 2006/2007 session 3,200 students.

By the 2007/2008 session it had 3,300 students. Its session commences in September and ends the following May. When at full-stream, the College is expected to have an annual intake of 5,000 professional students and another 1,000 practicing accountants on Mandatory Continuing Professional Development, MCPD.

== Programme ==
On graduation from the University or Polytechnic, the accounting graduate qualifies to attend the Nigerian College of Accountancy (NCA) where they are given professional education and training by experienced professional experts with sound educational background. The Nigerian College of Accountancy is headed by a Director General who is a Certified National Accountant. He is the Chief Executive and Accounting Officer of the College. The Governing Board of the Nigerian College of Accountancy consists of eight (8) Certified National Accountants with the Director General as Member/Secretary to the Board.

At the College, the system of lecturing is largely workshop oriented, garnished with tutorials. Visiting lecturers with wide practical experience are invited on periodic basis to provide tutorial to complement formal lectures.

The objective of this system of pedagogy is to develop students’ ability to practicalise theoretical concepts of a given situation. Students of the College are presumed to have mastered the principles and theories of accounting at degree or higher diploma levels at the University or Polytechnic.

The emphasis at Nigerian College of Accountancy is on practice and integrity, because the training procedure imparts knowledge, aptitude, skill, competence and, judgment in the application of these factors to problems in real life situation. Personality Presentation and Professional Ethics such as mode of dressing, development of personal confidence, sufficiency of self-discipline, self-analysis, self-criticism and caution which reduces the possibilities of mistakes and help acceptable ethical standards in serving the public and colleagues, end of the one year full time (nine months) course, students sit for the professional examination, PEA in January and PEB in May.

On passing the professional examinations, the student then qualifies to undertake a two-year supervised practical experience training in any sector of the economy. Thereafter, they becomes eligible to apply for membership of the Association, and if admitted as a member, they will be entitled to describe themself as a Certified National Accountant and to write after their name the designation “CNA”. At this stage, they are a fully qualified professional accountant but cannot yet set up an office for private practice until they fulfill additional conditions.
