= Omolola Oloworaran =

Nigerian politician

Director-General of the National Pension Commission (PenCom)
- Incumbent
- Assumed office July 2024
- President: Bola Ahmed Tinubu
- Vice President: Kashim Shettima
- Preceded by: Aisha Dahir-Umar

Omolola Oloworaran is a Nigerian civil servant and the director-general of the National Pension Commission (PenCom). her new position was based on the appointment done by President Bola Tinubu on 13 July 2024.

== Education ==
Omolola Oloworaran is a graduate of University of Ilorin, where she obtained a degree in Accounting. She also obtained a master of business administration (MBA) degree from the Manchester Business School. She is a member of Association of Chartered Certified Accountants (ACCA) and the Chartered Institute of Securities & Investment (CISI).

== Career life ==
In 13 July 2024, Omolola Oloworaran was appointed by President Bola Tinubu as the new Director-General of the National Pension Commission (PenCom). She succeeded Aisha Dahir-Umar. Before this, Omolola Oloworaran has worked at FirstBank Nigeria, where she served as Deputy General Manager, Group Head of First Shared Services. In June 2019, she was Head of Transaction Banking Operations at First Bank Nigeria from January 2016 to June 2019. She led International Business Center at Stanbic IBTC, and also served as Head of Global Market Operations, overseeing complex financial systems.
