= Simon Aranonu =

Nigerian accountant, banker and financial expert (born 1961)

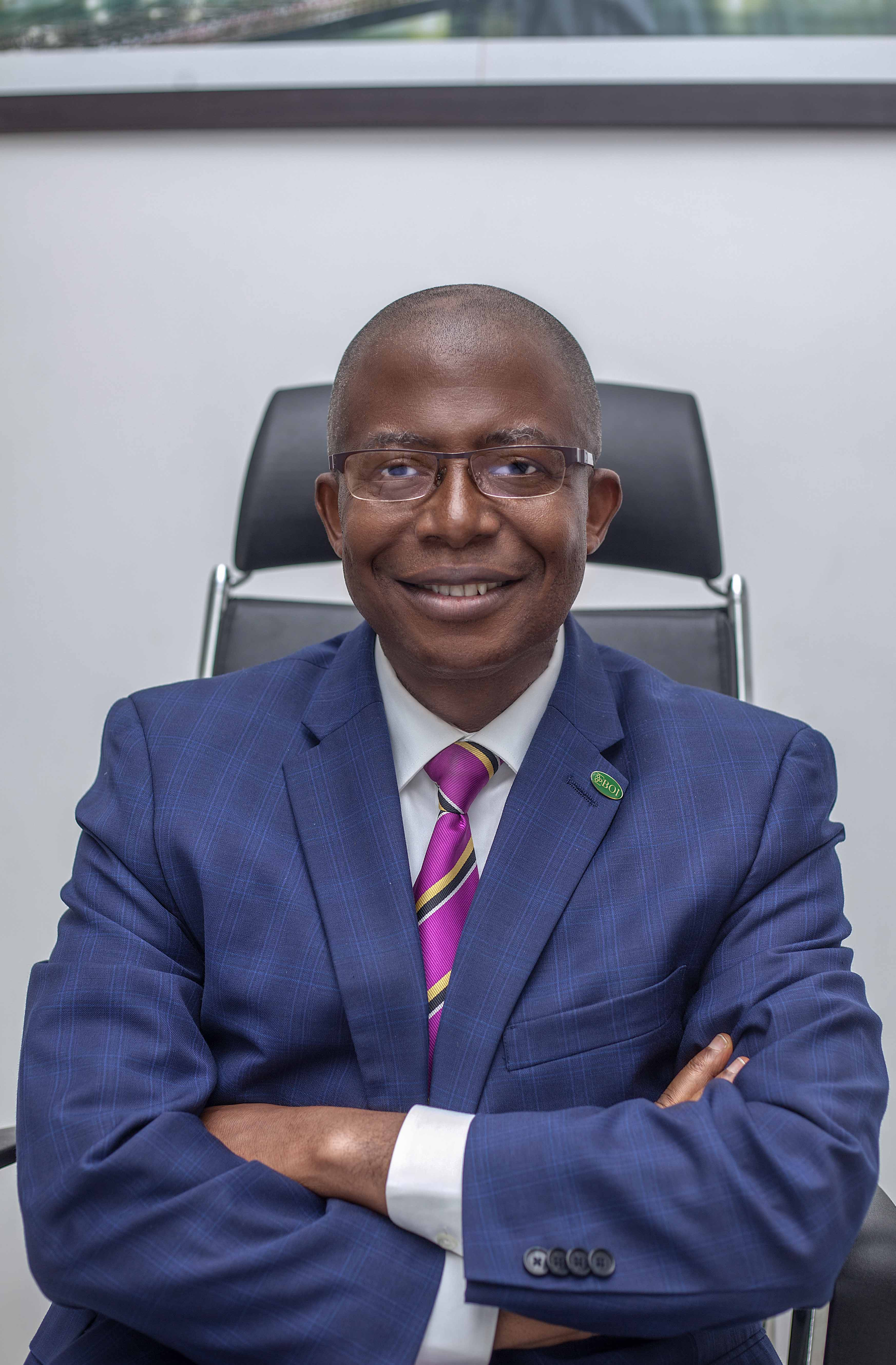
- Born: Simon Aranonu; 22 May 1961 (age 65)
- Occupations: Accountant and banking executive
- Years active: 1980–present

Simon Aranonu is a Nigerian accountant and banking executive. He is the executive director of Large Enterprises at the Bank of Industry.

== Early life ==
Aranonu was born on 22 May 1961, to the late Augustine Ejidike Aranonu who was a petty trader and Theresa Nwoye Aranonu, a seamstress in Onitsha, Anambra State. He gained admission into Oraifite Secondary School, a missionary school run by the Anglican diocese, in the southeastern part of Nigeria.

He obtained his primary education form the community primary school in rural Onitsha, Anambra State. He is a Christian and speaks two languages English and Igbo. As a child, Aranonu wanted to be a medical doctor, he has been working towards as a science student and also filled medicine in his Jamb form along with his friend. One afternoon, there was a change of plan when they both met with the school Guidance and Counselor approved of his friend's medical pursuit and disapproved of his. At that point, the counsellor changed Medicine and Pharmacy on the form to Accounting and Finance and that was how he started his finance journey of over 30 years.

== Education ==
Upon completing his primary education, he gained admission into the Oraifite community secondary school, a missionary school set up by the Anglican Diocese of Onitsha, in Onitsha Anambra state, in pursuit of his secondary school certificate. Upon graduation and his desire to acquire tertiary education, he returned to his primary school to teach for a whole year so as to save up for his tertiary education. He was admitted to the University of Nigeria Enugu State to study finance in 1980 and he graduated top of his class in the year 1984. as the best graduating student in the Finance department. He later proceeded to the graduate school of business of the Stanford University and he graduated in 1998. He also attended Harvard Business School Massachusetts, Chicago Business School, Chicago as well as Cranfield University He was a beneficiary of the USAID-sponsored Best and Brightest African Bankers training program in United States (Spring 2000).

== Career ==
After his first degree, Aranonu proceeded to Benin City, Edo State for his National Youth Service NYSC program. After one year, he returned to Lagos where he moved in with his brother between the year 1985 and 1987. Before kickstarting his banking career, he worked for a courier company in Ojuelegba and a trading company in Ilupeju Lagos. He is the executive director of "Large Enterprise" at the Bank of Industry BOI. He started his banking career at Chase Bank, an American bank. Simon's forte is credit and cooperate governance and licensed by IFC an arm of the World Bank to train directors on corporate governance.

His first banking job was his employment at the continental merchant bank in 1987.

He was executive director at Intercontinental Bank in 2008. and served as the executive director at Global Bank prior to his appointment at Intercontinental Bank In 1998, he joined the Institute of Chartered Accountants of Nigeria ICAN as a chartered accountant.

Aranonu has over 30 years working in the field of banking and finance at various financial institutions. Before he joined the Bank of Industry, he was a program coordinator at KRC Limited and Chief Financial Officer/Ag. Chief at Sapele Power PLC prior to which he served as the MD of Southern Africa franchise of Intercontinental Bank PLC now Access Bank PLC.

== Personal life ==
Simon Aranonu is married to his wife, Ijeoma Aranonu and they have four children. He is a pastor of the Redeemed Christian Church of God. He is based in Lagos, Nigeria.
