= Saadatu Hassan Liman =

Nigerian professor

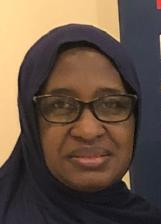
- Saadatu Hassan Liman (2025)
- Occupations: Academic, Researcher; Lecturer

Academic background
- Education: University of Jos

Academic work
- Discipline: Islamic Studies
- Institutions: Nasarawa State University, Keffi

Saadatu Hassan Liman is Nigerian professor of Islamic Studies and currently the vice chancellor of Nasarawa State University, Keffi.

== Early life and education ==
She received her first degree in Islamic studies from the University of Jos in 1998. She later obtained a Masters of Arts in Islamic studies in 2002 from the same university, and also got a Doctor of philosophy degree (PHD) in Islamic studies from the same University in 2010. She also holds postgraduate diploma in education, and a certificate in Islamic banking and finance in 2018 from Nasarawa state University.

== Career ==
Saadatu began her career with Nasarawa State University in 2002 as an assistant lecturer in Islamic studies. She was later promoted to professor of Islamic studies in 2017. Throughout her career in academia she has held several administrative positions including Coordinator of Islamic Studies, Acting Head of Department, Assistant Dean of Students' Affairs, Deputy Dean of Students' Affairs, Deputy Vice-Chancellor (Academic), Director of Research and Publications, and Deputy Vice-Chancellor (Administration).

Saadatu was appointed as the Vice Chancellor of Nasarawa stat, Keffi, in April 2024 making her the first female Vice Chancellor in Nasarawa state university Keffi. Her appointment was approved by the Governor of Nasarawa state following the high recommendations from the University Governing Council.

== Personal life ==
Saadatu got to married Hassan Muhammad Liman, who is a Senior Advocate of Nigeria (SAN), in 1989. Their marriage is blessed with children and grandchildren.

== Research ==
Saadatu carried out research on Islamic jurisprudence, women's rights, gender equality, Sharia implementation, and Muslim women's participation in leadership. She has written numerous academic publications both in national and international journals and has also supervised postgraduate research in Islamic studies. She has received research awards including an African Humanities Program Postdoctoral Fellowship from the American Council of Learned Societies for research on women's rights and cultural practices in Northern Nigeria.

== Awards ==
- Award of Scholarship for Best B.A. (Hons.) Islamic Studies Student, University of Jos (1992–1998).
- UNESCO/Suzanne Mubarak Japan–Egypt Friendship Research Fellowship for the Empowerment of Women in Peace and Gender Studies (2006).
- African Humanities Program Postdoctoral Fellowship, American Council of Learned Societies (2011–2012).
- Meritorious Award from the Organization of Women in Colleges of Education (WICE) for contributions to education
- Lecturers' Face of Reading Award, StandTall Africa Initiative (2020).
- Sir Ahmadu Bello Platinum Leadership Award (2021).
- UFUK Dialogue Peace Ambassador Award (2022).
- Fellow of the Institute of Islamic Finance Professionals of Nigeria (FIIFPN) (2022).

== Professional memberships ==
Saadatu has been a member of several professional and academic organizations, including:

- Nigeria Association of Teachers of Arabic and Islamic Studies (NATAIS)
- Nigeria Association of Female Teachers of Arabic and Islamic Studies (NAFTAIS)
- Institute of Islamic Finance Professionals of Nigeria
- Federation of Muslim Women's Associations in Nigeria (FOMWAN)
