= Attorneys in South Africa =

In South Africa, Attorneys are lawyers who provide legal advice and representation to clients, aiding individuals and businesses in their legal dealings, and as required, handling related correspondence and writing up contracts. In litigious cases, or when an opinion is required, the attorney will "brief" an Advocate; see below. Attorneys usually specialise in one area, such as Family Law, Property Law, Tax Law, or Commercial law.

Attorneys may form professional firms and practice in partnerships, ranging in size to the "Big Five" law firms. The profession is regulated by the Attorneys Act, 1979 (Act No. 53 of 1979). There are currently around 21400 attorneys and 5000 candidate attorneys in South Africa, each of which are represented by the Law Society of South Africa (LSSA)

== Training ==
University of Pretoria Faculty of Law building

For admission as an attorney, the academic qualification required is an LLB from a South African university. (Historically, the B.Proc. degree was also offered.) One then serves "articles" as a candidate attorney with a practicing attorney for a period specified according to the qualification of the candidate (generally two years if an appropriate legal degree has been obtained); the length of articles may be reduced by attending a practical legal training course or performing community service.

The candidate must also write a "board exam" set by the relevant provincial Law Society. The examination comprises the following:

- Paper 1: Practice and procedure (criminal procedure, supreme court procedure, magistrates’ court procedure and motor vehicle accident claims);
- Paper 2: Wills and Estates;
- Paper 3: Attorneys’ practice, contracts and rules of conduct;
- Paper 4: Legal bookkeeping.

Although not formally required for practice, specialist training, e.g. in tax, is usually via specialised postgraduate diplomas or LL.M. programmes. Attorneys may additionally qualify as Notaries and Conveyancers, via the Conveyancing and Notarial Practice Examinations; those with technical or scientific training may further qualify as patent attorneys, see §South Africa there.

== The Legal Practice Council of South Africa ==
The Legal Practice Council of South Africa (LPC) regulates the Legal Profession for all legal practitioners (Attorneys & Advocates) in South Africa. All practitioners are required to register at the relative provincial council where they completed their practical vocational training in terms of the Legal Practice Act 28 of 2014.

== Attorneys and Advocates ==
Attorneys are engaged directly by clients, acting as the “manager” of litigious cases. Although both attorneys and advocates may appear in the High Court of South Africa, they will 'brief' an advocate when specialist litigation is required. The split between attorney and advocate in South Africa mirrors the split between solicitor and barrister in other Commonwealth countries, with attorneys having broadly equivalent roles to solicitors and advocates having broadly equivalent roles to barristers.

== See also ==
- Law of South Africa
- List of bar associations in Africa
