= Akintola Williams =

Nigerian accountant (1919–2023)

- Born: 9 August 1919; Lagos, Colony and Protectorate of Nigeria
- Died: 11 September 2023 (aged 104); Lagos, Nigeria
- Occupation: Accountant
- Known for: First Chartered African Accountant
- Spouse: Mabel Efunroye née Coker
- Children: 2

Chief Akintola Williams (9 August 1919 – 11 September 2023) was a Nigerian accountant. He was the first Nigerian to qualify as a chartered accountant.

Williams began his education at Olowogbowo Methodist Primary School, Bankole street, Apongbon, Lagos Island, Lagos, in the early 1930s; the same primary school his late junior brother Chief Rotimi Williams attended. His youngest brother Rev. James Kehinde Williams was a pastor in the same church, Olowogbowo Methodist Church.

His firm founded in 1952, later grew organically and through mergers to become the largest professional services firm in Nigeria by 2004. Williams participated in founding the Nigerian Stock Exchange and the Institute of Chartered Accountants of Nigeria. During a long career, he received many honours, including Order of the Federal Republic

He married Mabel Efunroye Williams (née Coker) who was a member of the Coker family, a very prominent and influential family in Nigeria. Akintola Williams' brother-in-law, Mr. F.C.O Coker, along with Williams helped create the Institute of Chartered Accountants of Nigeria (ICAN) and Coker being the first ever president of ICAN.

== Birth and education ==
Akintola Williams was born on 9 August 1919. His grandfather, Z. A. Williams, was a merchant prince from Abeokuta and his father Thomas Ekundayo Williams was a clerk in the colonial service who set up a legal practice in Lagos after training in London, England. He was the older brother of Frederick Rotimi Williams, who later became a distinguished lawyer, and the late Rev. James Kehinde Williams, a Christian minister. For his primary education in the early 1930s, he attended Olowogbowo Methodist Primary School, Lagos. Williams then attended the CMS Grammar School, Lagos. He went on to Yaba Higher College on a UAC scholarship, obtaining a diploma in commerce. In 1944, he travelled to England where he studied at the University of London. Studying Banking and Finance, he graduated in 1946 with a Bachelor of Commerce. He continued his studies and qualified as a chartered accountant in England in 1949. A Yoruba of chiefly background, the Oloye Williams was one of the founders of the Egbe Omo Oduduwa society while in London, with Dr. Oni Akerele as president and Chief Obafemi Awolowo as Secretary.

== Accounting career ==
After returning to Nigeria in 1950, Williams served with the Inland Revenue as an assessment officer until March 1952, when he left the civil service and founded Akintola Williams & Co. in Lagos. The company was the first indigenous chartered accounting firm in Africa. At the time, the accountancy business was dominated by five large foreign firms. Although there were a few small local firms, they were certified rather than chartered accountants. Williams gained business from indigenous companies including Nnamdi Azikiwe's West African Pilot, K. O. Mbadiwe's African Insurance Company, Fawehinmi Furniture and Ojukwu Transport. He also provided services to the new state-owned corporations including the Electricity Corporation of Nigeria, the Western Nigeria Development Corporation, the Eastern Nigeria Development Corporation, the Nigerian Railway Corporation and the Nigerian Ports Authority.

The first partner in the firm, Charles S. Sankey, was appointed in 1957, followed by the Cameroonian Mr. Njoh Litumbe. Litumbe opened branch offices in Port Harcourt and Enugu, and later spearheaded overseas expansion. In 1964, a branch was opened in the Cameroons, followed by branches in Côte d'Ivoire and Swaziland, and affiliates in Ghana, Egypt and Kenya. By March 1992, the company had 19 partners and 535 staff.

Demand grew as a result of the Companies Act of 1968, which required that companies operating in Nigeria formed locally incorporated subsidiaries and published audited annual accounts. The drive in the early 1970s to encourage indigenous ownership of businesses also increased demand. In 1973, AW Consultant Ltd, a management consultancy headed by Chief Arthur Mbanefo, was spun off. The company acquired a computer service company and a secretarial service, and in 1977, the company entered into an agreement with Touche Ross International based on profit sharing. Williams was also a board member and major shareholder in a number of other companies. He retired in 1983.

Between April 1999 and May 2004, Akintola Williams & Co. merged with two other accounting firms to create Akintola Williams Deloitte (now known as Deloitte & Touche), the largest professional services firm in Nigeria with a staff of over 470,000 as at 2025.

== Public roles and honours ==
Williams played a leading role in establishing the Association of Accountants in Nigeria in 1960 with the goal of training accountants. He was the first President of the association. He was founding member of the Institute of Chartered Accountants of Nigeria. He was also involved in establishing the Nigerian Stock Exchange. He remained actively involved with these organisations into his old age. At a stock exchange ceremony in May 2011, he called on operators to protect the market and ensure there was no scandal. He said that, if needed, market operators should not hesitate to seek his advice on resolving any problem.

Public sector positions held by him include Chairman of the Federal Income Tax Appeal Commissioners (1958–68), member of the Coker Commission of Inquiry run by his brother-in-law Justice G.B.A. Coker, a Lagos High Chief into the Statutory Corporations of the former Western Region of Nigeria (1962), member of the board of Trustees of the Commonwealth Foundation (1966–1975), Chairman of the Lagos State Government Revenue Collection Panel (1973) and Chairman of the Public Service Review Panel to correct the anomalies in the Udoji Salary Review Commission (1975). Other positions include President of the Metropolitan Club in Victoria Island, Lagos, Founder and Council member of the Nigerian Conservation Foundation and Founder and chairman of the board of Trustees of the Musical Society of Nigeria.

In 1982, Williams was honoured by the Nigerian Government with the O.F. R. Following retirement in 1983, Williams threw himself into a project to establish a music centre and concert hall for the Music Society of Nigeria. In April 1997, Williams was appointed a Commander of the Most Excellent Order of the British Empire for services to the accountancy profession and for promotion of arts, culture and music through the Musical Society of Nigeria. The Akintola Williams Arboretum at the Nigerian Conservation Foundation headquarters in Lagos is named in his honour. On 8 May 2011, the Nigeria-Britain Association presented awards to John Kufuor, past President of Ghana, and to Akintola Williams, for their contributions to democracy and development in Africa.

== Death ==
Williams turned 100 in August 2019, and died at his home in Lagos on 11 September 2023, at the age of 104.
