= Corporate Affairs Commission =

Nigerian government body

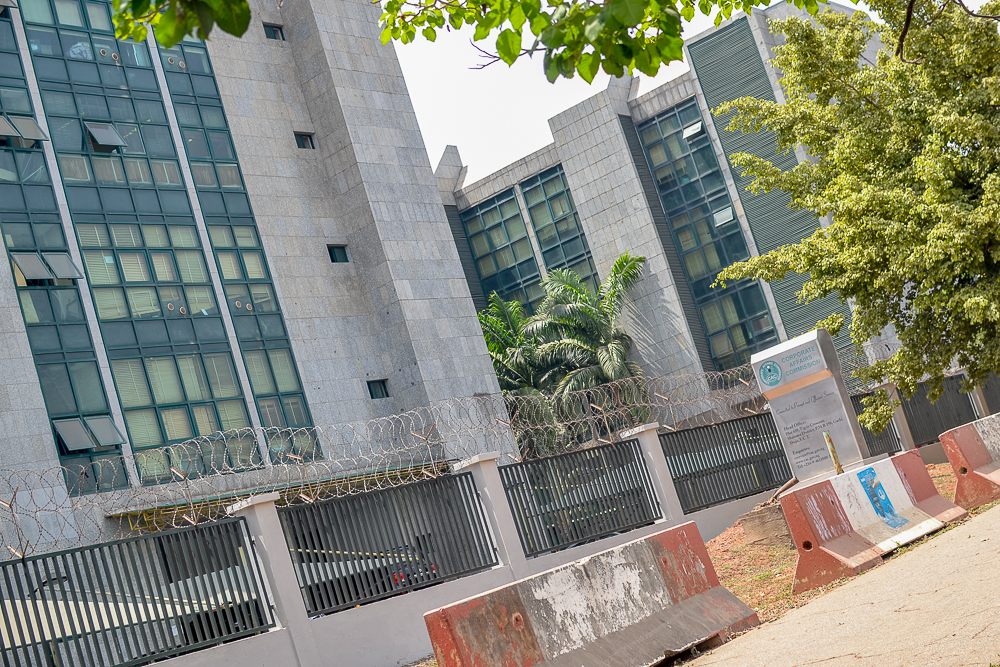

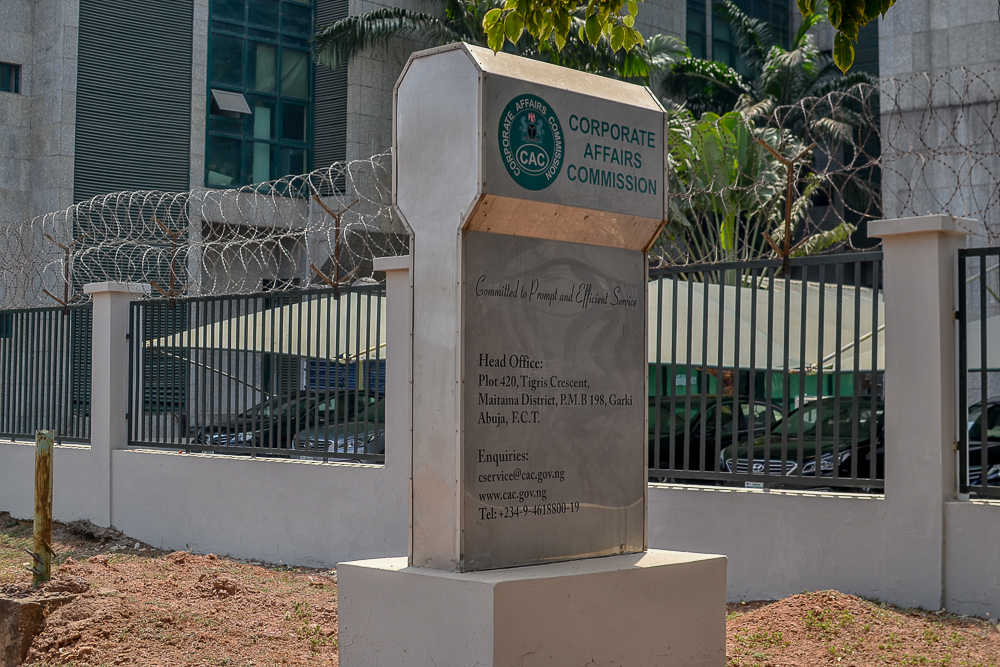
CAC Headquarters, Abuja

Corporate Affairs Commission (CAC) is a body of the Nigerian Government responsible for the regulation and management of companies in Nigeria. It was introduced in 1990 with the passing of the Companies and Allied Matters Act no 1 (CAMA) 1990, as amended, now on Act cap C20 Laws of Federation of Nigeria. It is headed by a chairman and closely assisted by the Registrar General/ CEO. Her headquarters is located in Plot 420, Tigris Crescent, Off Aguiyi Ironsi Street, Maitama, Abuja. Nigeria.

Its establishment, structure, and funding are now governed by the Companies and Allied Matters Act 2020. It is an autonomous body charged with the responsibility to regulate the formation and management of companies in Nigeria. It carries out its functions through accredited members of Association of National Accountants of Nigeria, Institute of Chartered Accountants of Nigeria, Institute of Chartered Secretaries and Administrators of Nigeria (ICSAN), and the Nigerian Bar Association (NBA). Prior to the enactment of CAMA, these activities were carried on under the Companies Act 1968. (CA 1948).

The commission's incumbent Registrar-General is Hussaini Ishaq Magaji, a Senior Advocate of Nigeria, who was appointed by President Bola Tinubu on 13 October 2023.

Other prominent offices of the board of CAC includes Manufacturers Association of Nigeria, Institute of Chartered Accountants of Nigeria (ICAN), Nigerian Bar Association, Securities and Exchange Commission, Federal Ministry of Trade and Investment, Nigerian Association of Chamber of Commerce, Industry, Mines and Agriculture, Federal Ministry of Justice and Federal Ministry of Finance. All these government agencies and parastatals send top representatives on the CAC board.

On Thursday, 25 May 2023, Nigeria launched its Open Central Register of Beneficial Ownership (known as the Persons with Significant Control Register) in line with its commitment at the Anti-Corruption Summit held in London on 12 May 2016.

== Anti Corruption Summit ==
On Thursday, 25 May 2023, Nigeria launched its Open Central Register of Beneficial Ownership (known as the Persons with Significant Control Register) in line with its commitment at the Anti-Corruption Summit held in London on 12 May 2016.

== Membership ==
The commission is made up of 10 members each representing the respective stakeholders, the board members are:

- The chairman - Ademola Seriki. The chairman is appointed by the president of the Federal Republic of Nigeria
- The Registrar-General/CEO - A. G. Abubakar
- The representative of the Manufacturers Association of Nigeria (MAN) - Alhaji Ali S. Madugu, mni
- The representative of the Institute of Chartered Accountants of Nigeria (ICAN) - Mazi Nnamdi Anthony Okwuadigbo
- The representative of the Nigerian Bar Association (NBA) - Bello Aminu Abdullahi
- The representative of the Nigerian Association of Chambers of Commerce, Industry Mines and Agriculture (NACCIMA) - Hajiya Saratu Iya Aliyu
- The representative of the Federal Ministry of Industry, Trade, and Investment (FMITI)- Muhammad Danjuma Alhassan
- The representative of the Securities & Exchange Commission (SEC) - Ms. Frana Chukwuogor
- The representative of the Federal Ministry of Justice - Mrs. Antoinette Ifeanyi Oche-Obe

== Services ==
Corporate Affairs Commission (CAC) Services are classified into segments:

PART A - Registry PART B - Registration of Business Names PART C - Registration of Incorporated Trustees (NGO’s)

These classifications above cover the following services:

- Incorporation of Companies (Private or Public Company, Limited by guarantee)
- Registration of Business Name
- Registration of Incorporated Trustees
- Same Day Incorporation Services under which companies are registered within one day
- Conducting searches
- Issuance of Certified True Copies of filed documents
- Registration of share capital increases, mortgages, etc.
- Post-incorporation services such as: Processing the statutory filings of Annual Returns, increase of share capital, changes in the memorandum and article of association, company addresses, name etc.
- Arrange or conduct investigations into the affairs of any company where the interests of the shareholders and the public so demand.
- Management and winding-up of companies.
- Monitoring the Compliance with the CAMA by companies.
- Sale of all statutory forms and publications of the Commission
- Responding to inquiries and complaints in respect of the services of the Commission.
- Handling the preliminary process of accreditation of Lawyers, Chartered Accountants, and Chartered Secretaries who are recognized professionals and direct users of the Companies Registry.

=== Types of services ===
Four (4) types of companies are recognized for business ventures in Nigeria, namely:

- Private Limited Company (LTD)
- Public Limited Company (PLC)
- Companies limited by guarantee and
- Unlimited Companies.

The minimum membership for each of these companies is two except for Private Limited Company which is one, and the maximum for private companies is fifty members while there is no upper limit for public companies. A minimum share capital of ten thousand Naira is prescribed for private companies and five hundred thousand Naira for public companies with a minimum subscription of 25% of the shares.

== See also ==
- List of company registers
