= Adolphus Aghughu =

Nigerian public servant

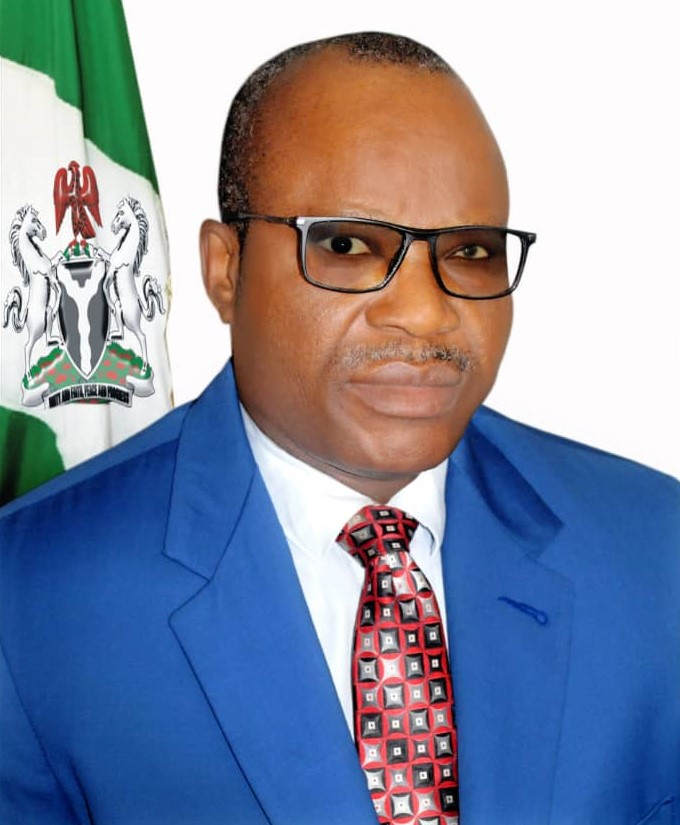

Auditor-General for the Federation
- In office 26 January 2021 – 7 September 2022
- Preceded by: Anthony Ayine

Director of Audit
- In office 1 January 2016 – 26 January 2021

Personal details
- Born: Adolphus Aghughu Arhotomhenla; 7 September 1962 (age 64) Idima Ewatto, Esan South-East, Edo State
- Education: Ambrose Alli University, University of Benin (Nigeria)
- Occupation: Public servant

Adolphus Aghughu Arhotomhenla (born 7 September 1962 in Edo State, Nigeria) is a Nigerian public servant. He was the Auditor General for the Federation and chairperson, African Union Board of External Auditors.

== Early life and education ==
Adolphus is a graduate of economics from Bendel State University now Ambrose Alli University, Ekpoma, Bendel State (Now Edo State) Nigeria in 1986. He performed his National Youth Service National Youth Service Corps (NYSC) in Kano State in 1987. He obtained a Master in (Economics) Money and Banking from the University of Benin (Nigeria), Benin City Nigeria in 1997. He is currently a part-time PhD student (Environmental Resource Management) with effect from 2017 at the School of Postgraduate Studies, Nasarawa State University Keffi, Nigeria.

== Professional career ==
He began his working career in 1980 as a teacher with Bendel State Government (now Edo State Government) and then became an Accountant with Edo State Government in 1988. He became an Auditor with the Office of the Auditor-General for the Federation in 1992. He was promoted to the rank of Director of Audit with effect from January 1, 2016, by the Federal Civil Service Commission (Nigeria) and was a candidate up to the final stage for the Post of Federal Permanent Secretary examination 2018 and 2019.

Adolphus is a Fellow of the Certified National Accountant of Nigeria, a fellow of the Chartered Institute of Taxation of Nigeria (FCTI) and a member of the Nigerian Institute of Management (Chartered). Mr. Adolphus Aghughu retired from the civil service on Wednesday, September 7, 2022, at the age of 60.
