= International Accounting Education Standards Board =

The International Accounting Education Standards Board (IAESB) was an independent organisation within the fold of the International Federation of Accountants (IFAC). The board developed guidance to improve standards of education in accountancy. It ended its term of service in 2019.

The board made significant contributions to international accountancy education and the global accountancy profession by developing high-quality, relevant International Education Standards and by harnessing stakeholder relations to understand future needs. In 2018, the IAESB and IFAC agreed on a new path forward that shifted the responsibility for the International Education Standards and guiding accountancy education into the future to IFAC, working in close partnership with its 180 member organizations, Network Partners and Forum of Firms stakeholders.

== Organization ==
Members of the board were nominated by IFAC member organizations or by IFAC's Transnational Auditors Committee. Public members may be nominated by member organizations, the TAC, other organizations and the general public. The International Association for Accounting Education & Research (IAAER) was an observer of the board. An IAAER research program funded by the Association of Chartered Certified Accountants (ACCA) creates research reports that inform the IAESB. The IAESB was subject to the oversight of the Public Interest Oversight Board (PIOB).

== Publications ==
In January 2010 the IAESB released its Framework for International Education Standards for Professional Accountants. This paper defines the underlying educational concepts of the IAESB standards, describes the IAESB publications, and affirms the obligations of IFAC member bodies relating to accounting education. The IAESB periodically updates standards. In March 2010 the IAESB asked for comments on a proposed revision to the International Education Standard that defined Competence Requirements for Audit Professionals. This is one of the eight standards that address the principles of learning and development for professional accountants. The IAESB strongly encouraged organizations and individuals to comment on proposed revisions. In May 2011 the IAESB released a proposed revision of International Education Standard for Assessment of Professional Competence, requesting comments.
