= F. C. O. Coker =

Nigerian accountant (1919–2003)

Frank Cuthbert Oladipo Coker
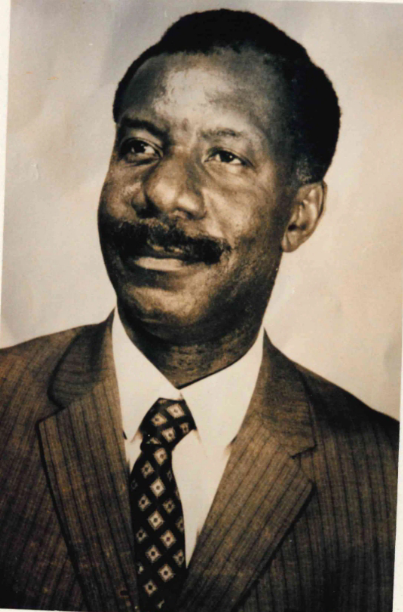
- Born: 30 January 1919; Lagos, Colony and Protectorate of Nigeria
- Died: 11 July 2003 (aged 84); Lagos, Nigeria
- Occupations: Accountant, economist
- Known for: First Nigerian Municipal Treasurer First President Of ICAN
- Spouse: Louisa Coker née Langely

Frank Cuthbert Oladipo Coker (30 January 1919 – 11 July 2003) was a Nigerian accountant, administrator, and civil servant. He was the first President of the Institute of Chartered Accountants of Nigeria(ICAN), where he helped to establish professional accounting standards in the country.

== Early life and education ==
Coker was born on 30 January 1919, in Lagos. He was the second child of George Baptist Coker and Mary Talabi Coker. Coker attended Olowogbowo Wesleyan School and later transferred to Igbobi College in 1932. After completing his secondary education, he worked at the Department of Customs and Excise (now the Nigerian Custom Administration) before pursuing a degree in Commerce through correspondence with the University of London. He faced challenges due to slow postal services and World War II but eventually earned his degree. Coker later studied accountancy at Oxford University, receiving scholarships and returning to Nigeria in 1952 with a master's degree in Economics and a Diploma in Public Administration. His father was the first Asiwaju of Lagos, while his mother was a skilled seamstress and cake maker.

== Public roles ==
He was also the first Nigerian Municipal Treasurer (Lagos City Treasurer), overseeing the financial administration of Lagos during a critical period of urban development. Additionally, he served as secretary to the first Lagos State Government, contributing significantly to governance and public administration. Alongside Akintola Williams his efforts saw the creation of both ICAN and The Association of National Accountants of Nigeria

== Challenges and allegations ==
The case African Newspapers of Nigeria Limited v. F. C. O. Coker (1973) was a libel suit where Coker, the plaintiff, sued the publishers of the Nigerian Tribune for defamation. Coker, who was the Permanent Secretary in the Ministry of Finance of Lagos State and formerly the City Treasurer of the Lagos City Council, claimed that the Nigerian Tribune published defamatory editorials about him on 5 and 11 February 1969. These editorials criticized his continued public service following the findings of the Saville Tribunal, which had investigated irregularities in the Lagos City Council. The Tribunal had noted certain improprieties in Coker's conduct but did not find him guilty of corruption. Despite this, the Nigerian Tribune's publications implied that Coker was corrupt and unfit for public office. Coker argued that these publications damaged his reputation and professional standing. The High Court of Lagos State ruled in favor of Coker and was awarded the sum of 25,000 pounds, leading to the defendants' appeal to the Supreme Court.

== Gallery ==
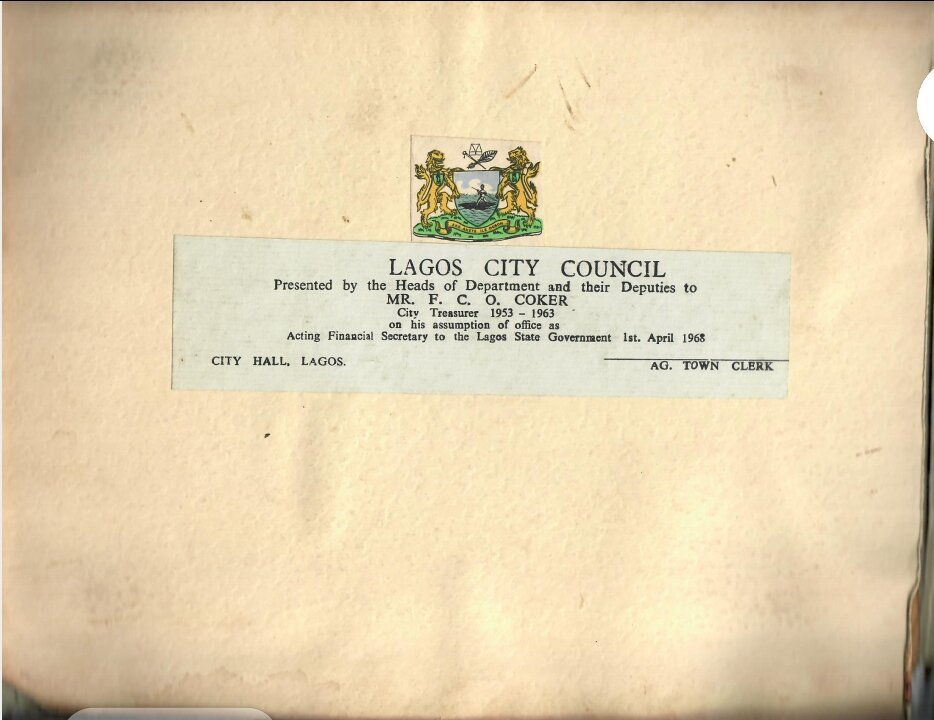
Lagos City Council Presentation to F. C. O. Coker

Newspaper publication of new appointees

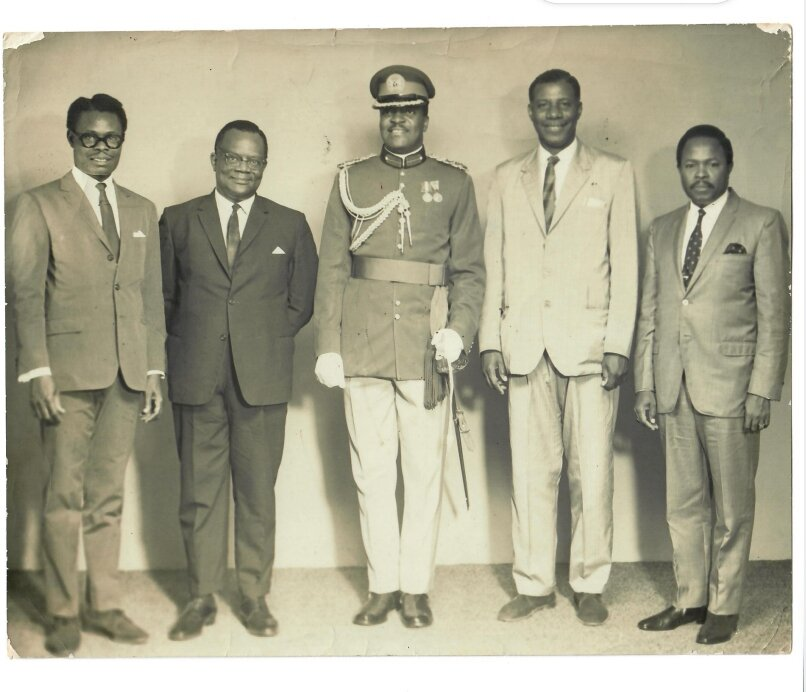
The Four Musketeers with Col. Mobolaji Johnson (Governor of Lagos State)

Signing of Eko Hotel

F. C. O. Coker sitting right og Col. Mobolaji Johnson

F. C. O. Coker, Howson Wright, Adeyemi Bero & Agoro
