= Muhammad Akaro Mainoma =

- Born: Muhammad Akaro Mainoma; September 26, 1965(56 years)
- Origin: Ahmadu Bello university.
- Occupations: Professor of Accounting and finance From University of Abuja Also a Vice chancellor of Nassarawa State University, Keffi, Nassarawa.

Mohammed Akaro Mainoma is a professor of Accounting and Finance from University of Abuja. He is the immediate past Vice Chancellor of Nasarawa State University, Keffi, Nassarawa. He is recently appointed as the President of the Association of National Accountants of Nigeria.

== Early life and education ==
Mainoma was born on September 26, 1965. He started his education at Dunama Primary School, Lafia, and attended Government Secondary School, Miango. He went to Ahmadu Bello University Zaria, Southern University Baton Rouge, University of Pittsburgh and University College Cork, Ireland. He holds B.Sc. Accounting, M.Sc. Accounting and Finance, Masters in Public Sector Accounting, from Nasarawa State University, Keffi, and Ph.D. in finance from the University of Abuja. He also holds an M.Sc. Accounting and Finance and Ph.D. from the Nigerian Defence Academy.

== Career ==
In 1990, he worked at Niger State Supply Company Ltd. He also worked with the NCR (NIG) PLC as a Planning Executive. Then in 1992, he join Ahmadu Bello University, Zaria.

== Membership and fellowship ==
He is a member of The Academy of Management Nigeria (TAMN). He is also a member Nigerian Institute of Management (NIM), Nigerian Economic Society (NES). He is a fellow of Association of National Accountants of Nigeria (ANAN) and Chartered Institute of Taxation of Nigeria (CITN). He lectured at Ahmadu Bello University, Zaria. He served as Commissioner for Finance, Nasarawa State between 2011 and 2013. He was the President of the Nigerian Accounting Association (2002–2012). He is a President of the Institute of Financial and Investment Analysts (IFIAN). He was a council member of the Nigerian Accounting Standard Board (NASB) (now the Financial Reporting Council of Nigeria). He is a Member of the Nasarawa State Governing Council representing Senate, the Governing Council of Association of National Accountants of Nigeria (ANAN) and Chartered Institute of Taxation of Nigeria (CITN). He is a member of ICT University Balori Rouge USA and International Association of Accounting Educators and Researchers.
