= Federal Medical Centre, Mubi =

Hospital in Adamawa State

Federal Medical Centre, Mubi is a federal hospital located in Mubi, Adamawa State. The current Chief Medical Director is Prof. Shuaibu Jauro Yahya.

== History ==
In 2022, Senator Aishatu Binani sponsored a bill seeking the establishment of Federal Medical Centre, Mubi. With assistance from Hon Ja’afar Abubakar Magaji, it was effected and the General Hospital Mubi was upgraded to the Federal Medical Centre, Mubi, with an MoU signed between the Federal Government and the Adamawa State Government.
