= Zaynab Alkali =

Nigerian novelist (born 1950)

- Born: 1950 (age 75–76); Tura-Wazila, Borno State
- Education: Bayero University Kano
- Spouse: Mohammed Nur Alkali
- Children: 6

Zaynab Alkali (born 1950) is a Nigerian novelist. She is also a poet and short story writer, recognized as the first female novelist in Northern Nigeria.

== Life and education ==
Alkali was born in Tura-Wazila in Borno State in 1950. She graduated from Bayero University Kano with a BA in 1978 and then obtained a doctorate in African Studies in the same university and became the principal of Shekara Girls' Boarding School. She went on to be a lecturer in English at two universities in Nigeria.

Alkali married the former vice-chancellor of the University of Maiduguri, Mohammed Nur Alkali, and they had six children. She became the dean in the faculty of arts at Nasarawa State University in Keffi, where she taught creative writing. She is regarded as the first woman novelist from Northern Nigeria.

== Career ==
Alkali worked in the University of Maiduguri as a senior lecturer in the English department for twenty years. Later on she left the University of Maiduguri to the National Primary Health Care Development Agency in Abuja, where she worked for three years until she left to work at Nasarawa State University.

The Stillborn, Alkali's best-known work, was published to critical acclaim in 1984. This coming-of-age novel depicts the physical and spiritual journey of a Nigerian woman who learns to survive, in the face of harsh traditions. The novel was quickly followed by The Virtuous Woman which was published by Longman, Nigeria in 1987. Like many talented writers of prose, Zaynab Alkali decided to try her hands on short prose form. Cobwebs & Other Stories was published by the famous Malthouse Press in Lagos in 1997. The Descendants was published by Spectrum Lagos 2005 and followed by The Initiates in 2007, and Invisible Borders 2016, Zaynab Alkali's books have been translated into many languages such as German, French, Arabic and Spanish. To date, Zaynab Alkali has won over 40 awards.

With literary success came professional development. Zaynab Alkali took up an appointment at the University of Maiduguri which she held for twenty-two years before joining the Civil Service as a deputy director at NPHCDA, Abuja in 2000. Four years later, she moved to Nasarawa State University, Keffi, as a full professor of English. She would later become dean of the faculty of arts, and dean of the School of Post-Graduate Studies. Between 2005 and 2009 Zaynab Alkali served as deputy vice chancellor (Admin), briefly acting as a vice chancellor in 2006. Between 2015 and 2016, she occupied the post of director, gender studies.

Alkali was awarded the title of Icon of Hope (2000) by President Olusegun Obasanjo. She received the Nigerian Woman of Distinction Award, on 29 September 2010 during Nigeria's Golden Jubilee, by President Goodluck Jonathan. The Adamawa State Governor, Murtala Nyako, gave her the Woman of Substance Merit Award on 2 October 2011. She was awarded a Lifetime Achievement Award for her contributions to the Nigeria Literary Canon by Nasir Ahmad el-Rufai at the Kaduna Book and Arts Festival (KABAFEST) on 5 September 2018.

Alkali serves as the board chairman of; Zayba Educational Resources Development, Keffi, Capital Science Academy, Kuje-Abuja and the National Library of Nigeria (NLN) Abuja. She also serves as vice chairman, Planning and Implementation Committee of Midlands University. Chairman board of trustees, (NADI) NURALKALI Development Initiative. Grand matron - Halimafactor Community Initiative – 20 November 2019, and Grand matron of the Effective Reading Campaign in Nigeria, November, 2019.

Zaynab Alkali has authored the following books, The Stillborn, The Virtuous Woman, Cobwebs & Others, The Descendants, The Initiates and the most recently Invisible Borders,. Three of the six books have won prizes, The Stillborn- ANA prize for the Best novel of the year, The Virtuous Woman – Spectrum Award (1978–2002), Cobwebs & Other Stories – ANA Award.

Zaynab Alkali is the proprietor of Zyba Model Nursery and Primary School in Keffi. She also oversees the operations of Zyba Farms. In addition to her educational and business activities, Alkali has produced literary works that explore the complexities of everyday human experiences.

Zaynab Alkali currently lives in Keffi. She was married to the late Professor Nur Alkali; they had six children and several grandchildren. In 2019, she was named as ANA fellow.

== Awards ==
Association of Nigerian Authors(ANA) Literary Prize, 1985

== Bibliography ==
- The Stillborn, Lagos: Longman (Drumbeats), 1984, ISBN 978-0-582-78600-4
- The Virtuous Woman, Longman Nigeria, 1987, ISBN 978-978-139-589-5
- Cobwebs & Other Stories, Lagos: Malthouse Press, 1997, ISBN 978-978-0230296.
- The Descendants, Tamaza, 2005, ISBN 978-978-2104-73-1
- The Initiates, 2007, ISBN 978-978-029-767-1

Edited

- Zaynab Alkali, Al Imfeld (eds.), Vultures in the Air: Voices from Northern Nigeria, Ibadan-Kaduna-Lagos: Spectrum Books, 1995, ISBN 978-978-2462-60-2

== See also ==
- List of Hausa people
