= Hussaini Ishaq Magaji =

Registrar General of Corporate Commission, Nigeria

Hussaini Ishaq Magaji SAN
- Registrar General

Registrar General of the Corporate Affairs Commission
- Incumbent
- Assumed office 13 October 2023
- President: Bola Tinubu
- Preceded by: Alhaji Garba Abubakar

Personal details
- Born: Hussaini Ishaq Magaji; 2 August 1982 (age 44) Shira, Bauchi State, Nigeria
- Party: APC
- Education: Ahmadu Bello University; Nigerian Law School
- Occupation: Lawyer; Politician

Hussaini Ishaq Magaji SAN is a Nigerian lawyer, politician, and the current Registrar General of the Corporate Affairs Commission (CAC) of Nigeria. He was appointed to this position by President Bola Tinubu on 13 October 2023.

== Career ==
As the Registrar-General of the Corporate Affairs Commission, Magaji works for the development and regulation of corporate affairs in Nigeria.
