= Certified National Accountant =

A Certified National Accountant is a Nigerian qualified professional accountant that has met the educational qualification and professional experience requirements for membership of Association of National Accountants of Nigeria (ANAN), and has been accepted as a member of the association. The Certified National Accountant is also the title of a quarterly journal of ANAN.

Accountancy graduates with a B.Sc. and Higher National Diploma from Nigerian Universities and Polytechnics qualify for admission to a three-year training program at the Nigerian College of Accountancy, Jos. On successful completion of the examinations they earn the designation of Certified National Accountant (CNA) and qualify to join ANAN.

== See also ==
- Certified Public Accountant
- Chartered accountant
- Chartered Certified Accountant
