= National Pension Commission =

National Pension Commission (PenCom) is the Nigerian body charged with the security and management of pension fund assets. Omolola Oloworaran is the Director General.

== Establishment ==
Following the introduction of the Pensions Act 2004 which introduced the Contributory Pension Scheme (CPS), it became statutory for employers and employees in both the public and private sectors to contribute towards the retirement of employees.

== History ==
- In May 2018, 2019 the National Pension Commission announced that its subscribers had risen from 7.5 million on 31 March 2017, to 7.9 million and the net asset of the fund also increased from N7.52 trillion to N7.79 trillion as of 28 February 2018.
- The operational report released by National Pension Commission in January 2019 stated that the country's pension assets under the Contributory Pension Scheme (CPS) had reached N8.45 trillion.
- In January 2022, the National Pension Commission reported that it had accumulated pension assets in excess of N13 trillion and invested in various sectors of the Nigerian economy.
- In 2022, the National Pension Commission announced it had automated the Pre-Retirement Verification Enrolment Exercise and issued 207 Pension Compliance Certificates (PCC) to organizations in the given year.
- In January 2023, the National Pension Commission announced a release of N13.89 billion pension for 2022 retirees by the Federal Government.

== Controversy ==
- In September 2022, After a report claiming that the least salary at PenCom was 3 million naira per month, the commission dismissed the claim saying its highest paid staff earns less than 1 million naira per month.
- In January 2023, some members of the Nigerian senate and pension operators disagreed over the request of the Nigeria Police Force to be exempted from the Contributory Pension Scheme. The senators, representatives of the Nigerian Police Force and the police retirees cited the need to have an independent pension scheme in line with the Police Pension Board Establishment Bill 2022 and to alleviate the police from the alleged poor service of the Contributory Pension Scheme. Pension Fund Operators Association of Nigeria and The National Pension Commission explained that the exemption of the Nigerian Police Force would set back the country's pension system.

== See also ==
- List of financial supervisory authorities by country
