= Nigerian Institution of Estate Surveyors and Valuers =

The Nigerian Institution of Estate Surveyors and Valuers (NIESV) was founded in 1969 by a group of General Practice Chartered Surveyors who were mostly trained in the United Kingdom. The Institution was recognized by the Federal government of Nigeria by the enactment of the Estate Surveyors and Valuers (Registration Act) Decree No. 24 of 1975.

The first Annual Conference of the institute was held at Ibadan in 1969. The Estate Surveyors and Valuers Registration Board of Nigeria (ESVARBON) is empowered to regulate and control the practice of the profession of Estate Surveying and Valuation in the country. The Institution is affiliated to the International Real Estate Federation (FIABCI), Commonwealth Association of Surveying and Land Economy (CASLE), International Federation of Surveyors (FIG), Royal Institution of Chartered Surveyors (RICS), Association of Professional Bodies of Nigeria(APBN) AND The International Valuation Standards Council (IVSC).

== Aims And Objectives ==
The objectives of the Institution as provided in Chapter 1 (i) of the Constitution of the Institution are as follows:

1. A) To establish a high and reputable standard of professional conduct and practice in the landed profession throughout the Federal Republic of Nigeria.
2. B) To secure and improve the technical knowledge which constitutes land economy including Valuation or Appraisal of Real Estate and such fixtures and fittings thereto including plant and machinery; Land Management and Development Investment and Town Planning and to facilitate the acquisition of such knowledge by working in close collaboration with Universities, Institutions of Higher learning and other professional bodies;
3. C) To promote the general interests of the profession and to maintain and extend its usefulness for the public good by advising members of the public. Government departments, Statutory Bodies, Local Governments, Association, Institutions and such like bodies on all matters coming within the scope of the profession and to initiate and consider any legislation relevant to the objects of the Institution;
4. D) To endeavour to acquaint the public with the role of the Estate of the Surveyor and valuer in the economic development of the country.

== The Profession And The Institution ==
The profession of Estate Surveying and Valuation is defined as the art, science and practices of:

1. A) Determination the value of all description of property and of the various interests therein;
2. B) Managing and developing estates and other businesses concerned with the management of landed property;
3. C) Securing the optimal use of land and its associate resources to meet social and economic needs;
4. D) Determining the structure: and the condition of building and their services and advising on their maintenance, alteration and improvement;
5. E) Determining the economic use of land resources by means of financial appraisal for the building industry; and
6. F) Selling (whether by auction or otherwise) and buying or letting (as an agent) of real and personal property and of any interest therein

The Nigerian Institution of Estate Surveyors and Valuers is a non-profit, voluntary, professional organization set up in 1969 to cater for the interest of the landed profession in Nigeria. The Institution was accorded official recognition six years later by the promulgation of the Estate Surveyors and Valuers Registration Act (see laws of Nigeria 1990. Volume 7. Chapter iii) which is more popularly known as Decree Number 24 of 1975 (Now CAP. E13 LFN 2004) The legislation establishes the estate surveyors and Valuers Registration Board of Nigeria, (ESVARBON), as a corporate body empowered to regulate the profession of Estate surveying and Valuation in Nigeria, The objectives of the Institution are four, namely:

1. A) To establish a high and reputable standard of professional conduct and practice in landed profession throughout Nigeria:
2. B) To secure and improve the technical knowledge of its members by close collaboration with the universities, other institutions of higher learning and other professional bodies.
3. C) To promote the general interest of the profession and maintain and extend its usefulness for the public good, and;
4. D) To acquaint the public with the role of the Estate Surveyors and Valuers in the economic development of Nigeria

Members of the institution have contributed immensely to the national development and the general progress of the country. Collectively, members of the Institution have made contributions to national discourse with a view to influencing the formulation of appropriate policies, especially on land matters. Examples includes advise on the evolution of the national Housing Policy, proposals on the bases of compensation for the property acquired for overriding public interest and recommendation on property rating, including assessment, collection and management. Individual members of the institution also made valuable contributions towards the relocation of the Federal Capital Territory, Abuja and in the formulation of new land policy for Lagos State. They have also served on lands tribunals and rent control panels at state and local government levels, and participated effectively in the development and management of urban areas.

== Membership ==
Membership of the institution is open to all Nigerians, and in certain cases to foreigners, trained in approved institutions; both in the country and abroad. There are three classes of membership, namely professional (Associate and Fellows), Non-professional members (Graduates, probationers and students) and Honorary members (persons who are not engaged in the practice of the profession but by reason of position, experience or eminence, assist in promoting the object of the profession the grand patron of the institution is the President and commander-in-chief of the Armed Forces of the Federal Republic of Nigeria, while the state governors are the Patrons of the institution.

== The Council ==
The affairs of the institution are managed by the Council, elected annually by ballot. The council consists of the following category of officials, namely; officers of the Institution, Un-official members, the Registrar of the Estate Surveyors and Valuers Registration Board of Nigeria (ESVARBON), and Chairman of state branches of the institution Assisting the council in policy formulation and implementation are nine (9) standing committee and a number of ad-hoc committee.

== Management Committee ==
The 2026/2028 Management Committee is made up of the 27th President and 8 National Officers as listed:

1) ESV BATURE ALI MUHAMMAD PNIVS, pslc
President and Chairman Of Council

2) ESV (DR) EMMANUEL MARK FNIVS, FRICS
1st Vice President

3) ESV OLUSHOLA ABEJI FOLARIN FNIVS, FRICS
2nd Vice President

4) ESV (DR) ETHEL MENDIE ASINYA FNIVS, mni
National Secretary

5) ESV ESTHER IKONNA ECHEM FNIVS
National Treasurer

6) ESV AYODELE ADETUNJI OLAMOJU FNIVS
National Publicity Secretary

7) ESV LANSA AGHAJI ANIVS
Asst. National Secretary

8) ESV ODEBODE OLUSEYI FNIVS
Asst. National Treasurer

9) ESV NWAMAKA V. OFOMA MNIVS
Asst. National Publicity Secretary

== The Branches ==
The Institution has Twenty-Nine branches; These are: Abia State, Akwa Ibom State, Anambra State, Adamawa/Taraba State, Bayelsa State, Benue State, Borno state, Bauchi/Gombe State, Cross River State, Delta State, Ebonyi State, Edo State, Ekiti State, Enugu State, FCT Abuja, Imo state, Kaduna state, Kano State, Kwara state, Kogi state, Lagos State, Niger State, Ogun State, Ondo state, Osun State, Oyo State, Nassarawa State, Plateau State and Rivers State. The branches are represented in the National Council through their chairman.

== Corporate Development ==
The Institution attaches great importance to the education of its members with emphasis on practical training and Mandatory Continuing Professional Development (MCPD). Members of the institution teaches, full-time or part time in a number of tertiary institution where courses in Estate management are offered at the undergraduate level. The Institution also organizes non-formal, but gradual training programme for those candidates who cannot undertake the regular full time education in Estate Management. In concert with the Registration Board, the Institution accredits Estate management programmes in tertiary Institutions in the country. Financial support, such as assistance to write and publish professional books made available to members of the Institution in academia to support the personal career paths and to complement these; the Institution has established a foundation known as NIESV Research Foundation to carry out research into specific areas of Estate Management and Real Estate related issues. A new training center has been established to foster continuous learning in identified areas of need. It is expected that the center will play a vital role in the ongoing efforts to incorporate, via proper training, the estate agents, those who are not trained to practices agency, one of the core areas of the profession. The aim is to tackle once and for all issues of quackery and to sanitize the real estate industry in Nigeria.
