= Shuaibu Adamu Ahmed =

Nigerian public servant

- Occupations: Nigerian Minister of Industry, Trade and Investment
- Notable work: He was appointed as Nigeria's ambassador to Qatar in 2013

On Thursday, 6 May 2021, Shuaibu Adamu Ahmed was inaugurated by the Nigerian Minister of Industry, Trade and Investment, Adeniyi Adebayo as the Executive Secretary/Chief Executive Officer of the Financial Reporting Council (FRC) of Nigeria.

On Tuesday 26 October 2021, he warned government agencies against delays in filing their audited financial statements.

Ahmed contested for the governorship of Bauchi State, North East Nigeria, in 2019, under New Nigeria Peoples Party (NNPP).

He was appointed as Nigeria's ambassador to Qatar in 2013.

He attended King's College, Lagos, Nigeria and the Ahmadu Bello University, Zaria, North-West Nigeria. He is also an alumnus of Harvard Kennedy School at Harvard University. He is a Fellow of both the Institute of Chartered Accountants of Nigeria and Association of Chartered Certified Accountants (UK).
