= Journal of International Financial Management and Accounting =

Academic journal

Journal of International Financial Management & Accounting
- Discipline: Business, finance
- Language: English
- Edited by: Editor-in-Chief : Sabri Boubaker, EM Normandie Business School, France

Publication details
- History: 1989-present
- Publisher: John Wiley & Sons
- Frequency: Triannual
- Impact factor: 9.4 (2023)

Standard abbreviations
- ISO 4: J. Int. Financ. Manag. Account.

Indexing
- ISSN: 0954-1314 (print); 1467-646X (web)
- LCCN: 91640601
- OCLC no.: 38911903

Links
- Journal homepage; Online access; Online archive

The Journal of International Financial Management & Accounting is a triannual peer-reviewed academic journal published by John Wiley & Sons. It covers the international aspects of financial management, banking, financial services, auditing, and taxation. The editor-in-chief Sabri Boubaker (EM Normandie Business School, France), and Co-Editors Ioannis Tsalavoutas (University of Glasgow, United Kingdom) and Xiaoqian Zhu (University of Chinese Academy of Sciences, China).

The journal was established in 1989. The founding Editors were Professor Richard Levich (New York University), Professor Frederick DS Choi (New York University), and Professor Sidney Gray (University of Glasgow). The journal was originally published with the support of the New York University Graduate School of Business (which later became New York University's Stern School of Business, Salomon Center

It has been an official journal of the International Association for Accounting Education and Research since 1999.

== Abstracting and indexing ==
The journal is abstracted and indexed in the Social Sciences Citation Index, ProQuest, Current Contents/Social & Behavioral Sciences, and EBSCO databases. According to the Journal Citation Reports, the journal has a 2022 impact factor of 5.1, ranking it 17 out of 111 journals in the category "Business Finance" (Q1 in Clarivate Analytics). The CiteScore 2022 is 5.7, ranking it in the 86th decile in both accounting and finance.
