= Equatorial Guinea Bar Association =

The Equatorial Guinea Bar Association (Colegio de Abogados de Guinea Ecuatorial) was an association of lawyers in Equatorial Guinea. In May 2002 the government dissolved the association by decree. The Minister of Justice and Worship created a High Council of Lawyers, chaired by himself, and declared that all lawyers must apply to his ministry for recognition. The Human Rights Institute of the International Bar Association visited the country in July 2003, and issued a report expressing serious concern. They cited abuses such as torture, failure to guarantee the right to a fair trial, lack of freedom of expression and association, and poor prison conditions. They concluded that the rule of law no longer applied. A new Bar Association was formed in January 2003. A report prepared for the UNHCR and issued in 2004 said that all members of the new Bar Association were reportedly appointed by, and are under the control of, the Minister of Justice.
