= Shuaibu Jauro Yahya =

Nigerian professor and physician

Shuaibu Jauro Yahya is a Nigerian professor of reproductive health and statistics. He is currently the Chief Medical Director of the Federal Medical Centre, Mubi, Adamawa State. His appointment was confirmed in August 2023 by President Bola Tinubu.

== Early life and education ==
Shuaibu Jauro Yahya is a Nigerian-born medical doctor. He studied medicine. He did research on breast cancer and later worked in the Community Medicine Department at the University of Maiduguri.
