= Shuaibu Ibrahim (Army) =

Nigerian general

Major General Shuaibu Ibrahim

18th Director General of NYSC
- Incumbent
- Assumed office 10 May 2019
- Preceded by: Suleiman Kazaure

Registrar, Nigerian Army University, Biu, Borno
- In office 2018–2019
- Succeeded by: S. S. Ibrahim

Head of Department, History and War Studies, Nigerian Defence Academy
- In office 2015–2017

Commandant, Command Secondary School, Suleja, Niger
- In office 2012–2014

Personal details
- Born: 13 July 1967 (age 59)
- Education: University of Jos; Tai Solarin University of Education; University of Abuja

Military service
- Allegiance: Nigeria
- Branch/service: Nigerian Army
- Rank: Major General

Shuaibu Ibrahim, DSS, Ph.D., MTRCN, (born 13 July 1967) is a Nigerian Army general and the former Director General of NYSC, a position he assumed on 10 May 2019 and his tenure ended in 2022. Prior to his appointment as the 18th DG of NYSC, he was the Registrar of the Nigerian Army University, Biu, Borno. In 2007, he was decorated with Forces Service Star (FSS), in 2012, he was decorated with Meritorious Service Star (MSS), whilst in 2018, he was decorated with Distinguished Service Star (DSS). He is a member of Historical Society of Nigeria (HSN) and Teachers Registration Council of Nigeria (MTRCyN).

== Early life and education ==
Major General Shuaibu Ibrahim is a native of Nasarawa LGA in Nasarawa, Nigeria. From 1985 to 1989, he studied History (B.A.) at University of Jos. From 1991 to 1992, He studied history (M.A.) also at University of Jos. From 2002 to 2007, he studied history (PhD.) from University of Abuja. In 2007, he finished his PGDE at Tai Solarin University of Education.

Upon joining the Nigerian Army, In 1994, he attended Nigeria Army Education Corps (NAEC) Young Officers Course, which was followed by Infantry Young Officers Course in 1996. In 2004, he attended Training Development Advisers Course (TDA), which was followed by NAEC Officers Executive Management Course in 2013. He has worked at different places and has worked on different assignments. Firstly, he was posted to Institute of Army Education (IAE) as a Research Officer, where he researched and produced Briefs and Journals for the Nigerian Army. From 1996 to 1999, he was posted to Director General of NYSC, where he worked as a military assistant to the then DG of NYSC.

From 2000 to 2004, he was posted to the (Nigerian Defence Academy) (NDA), where he taught Year 1 and Year 2. From 2004 to 2009, he was posted to National Defence College (NDC) where acted as a Staff Officer/Military History. From 2009 to 2011, he was posted to Nigerian Army School of Education, where he was a Senior Instructor. From 2011 to 2012, he was posted to the Headquarters of Nigerian Army Education Corps, where he served as a Staff Officer 1, Books Resources Procurement. From 2012 to 2014, he was posted to Command Secondary School, Suleja, Niger, where he served as the Commandant.

From 2015 to 2018, he was posted to the Nigerian Defence Academy, where was served as the Head of Department (HOD), History and War Studies. From 2018 to 2019, he was posted to the Nigerian Army University in Biu, Borno, where he was the Pioneer Registrar. On April 26, 2019, he got his highest appointment, when he was appointed as the Director General of the NYSC. Over the years, he has written, authored and co-authored Books and Journals. Major General Shuaibu Ibrahim is a married man with children.

== Director-General of NYSC ==
On 26 April 2019, Nigerian Chief of Army Staff, Lt Gen TY Buratai, approved the appointment of Maj. Gen. Ibrahim as the new Director General of the National Youth Service Corps (NYSC), to replace Major General Suleiman Kazaure, who was on the saddle since April 18, 2016 as the NYSC boss. Before the appointment of Ibrahim, he was the Registrar, Nigerian Army University, Biu, Borno.

=== Controversy over his appointment ===
On 30 April 2019, after his appointment as the 18th Director-General of NYSC, the Nigerian Senate began a probe over his appointment, after the senator representing Kogi West, Senator Dino Melaye, moved a motion for the probe, stating that the appointment was an ‘infraction’ of existing laws. In his debate, Mr Melaye argued that the appointment of an NYSC DG was the sole responsibility of the Nigerian President, Muhammadu Buhari. The Senate Committee on Youth and Sports were given one week to probe the appointment.

On 9 May 2019, after the report of the Committee on Youth and Sports Development was considered, the Nigerian Senate concluded that due process was followed in his appointment.
