= Oni Akerele =

Nigerian doctor (??–1983)

John Oni Akerele
- Died: 1983
- Occupation: Doctor
- Known for: Political activism

John Oni Akerele (died 1983) was a Nigerian doctor, Nigeria's first indigenous surgeon.

While living in London, in 1941 he married Dorothy Jackson, who was of African, European and Native American descent, and they set up home in Kilburn, in the north of London. Their house became a meeting place for Africans such as Nnamdi Azikiwe, the first President of Nigeria, and Jomo Kenyatta of Kenya. While in London, in 1945 he was one of the founders of the pan-Yoruba cultural society Egbe Omo Oduduwa, and was the first president. Members included Obafemi Awolowo, Secretary, Akintola Williams, Saburi Biobaku, Ayo Rosiji and others.

Akerele returned to Nigeria after independence in 1960, and became medical officer to the Western Region in Ibadan. During the Nigerian Civil War (1967–1970) they moved to Lagos, where Akerele set up a private practice. He died in 1983. Dorothy lived on to the age of 93, dying in April 2007.

His daughter Kofoworola Bucknor-Akerele also became a prominent politician in Nigeria.
