= Institute of Chartered Accountants of Nigeria =

Professional accountancy body

The Institute of Chartered Accountants of Nigeria (ICAN)
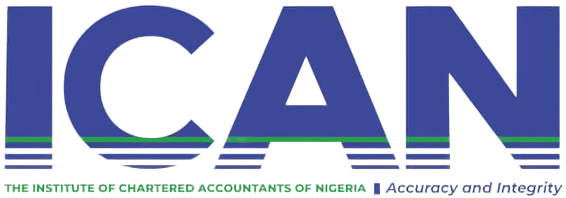
- Formation: 1 September 1965
- Type: Professional association
- Purpose: To encourage professionalism in accountancy in Nigeria
- Headquarters: Plot PC. 16, Idowu Taylor Street, Victoria Island, Lagos
- Location: Nigeria
- Members: Over 63,000
- Official language: English
- President: Mallam Haruna Nma Yahaya, mni, Ph.D., FCA
- Affiliations: IFAC, PAFA, ABWA and CAW
- Website: www.icanig.org
- Remarks: Registrar/ CEO, Musibau Lanre Olasunkanmi, Phd, FCA

The Institute of Chartered Accountants of Nigeria (ICAN) is a professional accountancy body in Nigeria. It is one of the two professional accountancy associations with regulatory authority in Nigeria, the other being the Association of National Accountants of Nigeria (ANAN). The relationship between the two organizations has been tense. In 2007 ICAN attempted to have a bill declaring ANAN void.

== Formation and growth ==
Logo as of 2024

The Association of Accountants of Nigeria (AAN) was formed in 1960 with the goal of training accountants, and was established in part by Akintola Williams and F.C.O Coker with Coker acting as its first president. ICAN was created by an Act of Parliament No. 15 on 1 September 1965 from existing accounting and auditing organisations including the AAN, and is headquartered in Lagos. As of 2020, ICAN has over 63,000 members.

== Standards and authority ==
ICAN has based its practices on those of British chartered accountancy institutes. Nigeria adopted international accounting standards with little modification. It is a member of the International Accounting Standards Committee (IASC) and periodically adopts its standards. Any deviation from these standards must be disclosed in the company's financial statements.

In the 1990s, ICAN predominantly had members holding qualifications from the London-based Association of Chartered Certified Accountants (ACCA). Although ICAN claimed complete independence from the ACCA, it was under attack for defending the status quo in accountancy practices and for suppressing changes to address local requirements.

In August 2010, the federal government approved migration to International Financial Reporting Standards (IFRS) by 2012. In May 2011, Joshua Okeowo, chairman of the Ikeja District of ICAN, said adopting the IFRS would encourage foreign investment in Nigeria and it would also "reduce cash transactions in the economy, thereby reducing the incidence of armed robbery".

The Companies Act of 1968 required that a duly recognized auditor audits all limited liability companies. As of 1993, only members of the ICAN who pass ICAN examinations and gain a practising certificate are qualified to be auditors. Although a growing number of financial analysts in Nigeria are designated certified financial analysts, there is nobody in Nigeria that certifies analysts to produce research reports, most of which are prepared by ICAN members or the Chartered Institute of Stockbrokers. A consultant offering financial services in Nigeria must be a member of either ANAN or ICAN. In March 2011, Oladapo Afolabi, Head of the Civil Service, said that professional certificates of associations such as ICAN and ACCA could be used in recruitment and advancement in the public service, but could not be required.

== Relationship with ANAN ==
The Association of National Accountants of Nigeria (ANAN) was chartered on 25 August 1993. The government had given ANAN the mandate to compete with ICAN, and by 1994 the two organisations fought for control of chartered accountants in Nigeria. In 2002, ICAN petitioned the court to disqualify and/or bar Clement Akpamgbo from representing ANAN, and the matter was referred to a lower court. ANAN appealed the decision, but it was dismissed for lack of merit. In November 2007, a federal high court in Lagos dismissed a suit by ICAN requesting the court to declare that the decree establishing ANAN was void.

In March 2009, the ANAN president, Samuel Nzekwe, rejected an attempt by ICAN to set auditing standards for its members. He said that the Nigerian Accounting Standards Board (NASB) Act 2003 said that only the board could set standards for the accounting profession.

In June 2010, Godson Nnadi, Executive Secretary of Nigeria Accounting Standards Board, spoke in favour of a new body to set accounting and auditing standards for Nigeria and other African nations, which would be independent of both ANAN and ICAN.

== Other professional bodies ==
In May 2008, the House of Representatives rejected a bill to establish the Chartered Institute of Management Accountants of Nigeria (CIMA) as an alternative to ANAN and ICAN. The House was concerned about proliferation of accounting bodies. ICAN was strongly opposed to establishment of CIMA, while ANAN said it supported the proposal given the dynamics of the profession.

In December 2009, there were delays in the passage by the Senate of bills on the Institute of Chartered Public Accountants (CPA) and the Chartered Institute of Management and Cost Accountants (CIMCA). The bills had been approved by both houses during the administration of President Olusegun Obasanjo. Still, he had failed to sign them into law before the end of his term. As a result, President Umaru Yar'Adua had to resubmit the bills when he took office in 2007. ANAN did not object to the new organizations but ICAN expressed concerns on the grounds of proliferation. As of March 2010, the bills had still not cleared the Senate.

In May 2011, Sebastian Owuama, President of ICAN, attended the annual tax conference of the Chartered Institute of Taxation of Nigeria (CITN) in Abuja where he called for an end to the squabble between ICAN and the CITN. The move was welcomed by CITN president Rasaq Adekunle Quadri.

In May 2011, retired major general Sebastian Achulike Owuama, the 46th president of ICAN and the 16th president of the Association of Accountancy Bodies in West Africa, was elected president of the newly created Pan-African Federation of Accountants (PAFA).

== Controversy ==
Scandals of banking malpractice were exposed in 2009, with the Central Bank of Nigeria leading investigations that led to bank closures and dismissal of directors, some of whom were arrested by the Economic and Financial Crimes Commission. Olutoyin Adepate, the ICAN registrar, said "the current crises should be fully investigated and persons found guilty sanctioned according to the laws of the nation... the larger interest of the national economy and the Nigerian people must be defended at all cost".

== Fellows/notable alumni ==
- Ibikunle Amosun
- Rasaq Adekunle Quadri
- Okezie Ikpeazu
- Adesola Kazeem Adeduntan
- Simon Aranonu
- Hajiya Hama Ali Muhammad
- Akintola Williams
- Shuaibu Adamu Ahmed
- Akinwunmi Ambode
- Okechukwu Enelamah
- Olusegun Olutoyin Aganga
- Ibrahim Hassan Dankwambo
- F.C.O. Coker
