= Association of National Accountants of Nigeria =

Organization

- Abbreviation: ANAN
- Formation: 1979
- Type: Professional Association
- Headquarters: ANAN House, Plot 559, Mabushi District, off Ahmadu Bello Way, Abuja, Nigeria
- Official language: English
- President: Chief Hajia Zuwaira Talatu Kishimi, FCNA. President ANAN
- Website: https://www.anan.org.ng//

The Association of National Accountants of Nigeria (ANAN) is one of the two professional accountancy associations with regulatory authority in Nigeria, the other being the Institute of Chartered Accountants of Nigeria (ICAN). A consultant offering financial services in Nigeria must be a member of either ANAN or ICAN.

== Organization ==
ANAN was founded on 1 January 1979 and was incorporated on 28 September 1983. The Association was chartered on 25 August 1993 by Decree 76 of 1993. The governing council of ANAN is elected by its members. It includes representatives of the Auditors General of the Federation, State, and Local Government, and representatives of universities and polytechnics.

Before being admitted to ANAN members must undertake academic studies, including one year at ANAN's Nigerian College of Accountancy, followed by a two-year practical accountant-in-training program, leading to qualification as a Certified National Accountant. ANAN members must comply with its Professional Code of Conduct, which complies with International Federation of Accountants requirements. As of December 2007, ANAN had a total membership of 10,260. By December 2010 membership had grown to 16,207.

ANAN was admitted as a member of the Association of Professional Bodies of Nigeria on 7 December 2010. ANAN is also a member of the Financial Reporting Council of Nigeria (FRCN), which sets accounting standards for the country. Both ANAN and ICAN nominate two members to the NASB board.

ANAN is an institutional member of the International Association for Accounting Education & Research (IAAER). ANAN is a correspondent member of XBRL International, which is developing a standard for electronic representation of accounting information. Both ANAN and ICAN work with the United Kingdom-based Chartered Institute of Public Finance and Accountancy (CIPFA) to promote best practices in the profession. As of March 2011, ANAN had applied to become a member of the Association of Accountancy Bodies in West Africa (ABWA) and is now listed as Council member of ABWA. ANAN was admitted into membership of Pan African Federation of Accountants. ANAN is now a member of International Federation of Accountants (IFAC).

== Educational activities ==
Both ANAN and its rival ICAN, as well as the Chartered Institute of Taxation of Nigeria (CITN), have been criticized for not providing enough training to members at subsidized rates. However, ANAN operates a training school for accountants in Jos, Plateau State.At a ceremony in March 2006 the President of ANAN, Professor E. R. Iwok, laid the foundation stone of an ultra-modern auditorium for the Nigerian College of Accountancy. He said that ANAN planned to build the leading accountancy campus in Africa and to make Jos the Mecca of the accountancy profession. As of March 2011 the college, which was attracting growing numbers of students from other countries in Africa, was still operating out of temporary facilities.The only buildings completed at the permanent site were two large examination halls with capacity of 3,000. The college is a University Member of IAAER.

== Competing organizations ==
In its charter, the government gave ANAN the authority needed to compete with ICAN. By 1994 the two organizations were fighting for control of the Chartered Accountants profession. In 2002 ICAN applied to the courts to disqualify and/or bar Mr Clement Akpamgbo from representing ANAN, and the matter was referred to a lower court. ANAN appealed the decision, but the appeal was dismissed for lack of merit. In November 2007 a Federal High Court in Lagos dismissed a suit by ICAN requesting the court to declare that the decree establishing ANAN was void.

In March 2009, ANAN President Dr Samuel Nzekwe rejected an attempt by ICAN to set auditing standards for its members. He said that the Nigerian Accounting Standards Board (NASB) Act 2003 said that only the board could set standards for the accounting profession. In June 2010 Mr. Godson Nnadi, Executive Secretary of Nigeria Accounting Standards Board, spoke in favor of a new body to set accounting and auditing standards for Nigeria and other African nations. The new body would be independent of both ANAN and ICAN.

In May 2008 the House of Representatives rejected a bill to establish the Chartered Institute of Management Accountants of Nigeria (CIMA) as an alternative to both the ANAN and ICAN. The House was concerned about proliferation of accounting bodies. In December 2009 were delays in passage by the Senate of bills on the Institute of Chartered Public Accountants (CPA) and the Chartered Institute of Management and Cost Accountants (CIMCA). The bills had been approved by both houses during the administration of President Olusegun Obasanjo, but he had failed to sign them into law before the end of his term. As a result, President Umaru Yar'Adua had to resubmit the bills when he took office in 2007. ANAN did not object to the new organizations but ICAN expressed concerns on the grounds of proliferation.

In May 2012, ICAN President Prof. Francis Ojaide, has said the body and the Association of National Accountants of Nigeria have smoothed their relationship for the benefit of the nation's economy.

== News events ==
Speaking in August 2009, the ANAN President Chief (Mrs). Iyamide Gafar criticized the recent dismissal of the heads of five banks as being selective, with just five scapegoats. Saying that the problems were more widespread, she also advocated more frequent rotation of accountants and auditors between banks to prevent them from getting too close to management.

In September 2009 it was alleged that the Comptroller General of the Nigerian Customs Service, Abdullahi Inde Dikko, had obtained a fake West African Examinations Council (WAEC) certificate dated 1980. It was said that when ICAN discovered the fake, Dikko abandoned an attempt to become a fellow of ICAN and instead opted for ANAN membership. These allegations were later proven false, and the police declared Dikko's accuser Olajide Ibrahim wanted for making false allegations. In October 2010 President Goodluck Jonathan spoke at the Annual National Conference of ANAN. He challenged his audience to champion transparency and fight corruption by refusing to allow manipulation of accounting records and processes for corrupt purposes.

The ANAN donated a research center to the Nasarawa State University, Keffi, which was opened in May 2011, possibly the first donation of this type in Nigeria. The purpose of research would be to find ways to ensure that the Accountancy profession meets its goals in effective public and private sector service delivery. On 29 April 2011 the first female auditor-general of Kogi State, Maryam Ladi-Ibrahim, succeeded Iyamide Gafar as ANAN President. Johnson.O.Oluata FCNA represents ANAN at the National Conference.
