= Tanganyika Law Society =

- Predecessor: []]
- Type: Professional association
- Location: Dar es salaam, Tanzania
- Official language: English
- President: Boniface Anyisile Kajunjumele Mwabukusi
- Website: tls.or.tz

Tanganyika Law Society is the organisation which is part of the bar association of Tanzania Mainland which was founded in 1954 by an act of parliament-the Tanganyika Law Society Ordinance 1954.
