= Dorothy Akerele =

British-Nigerian musician and hostess

Dorothy "Aunty Dolly" Akerele, née Jackson (1913–2007) was a British-Nigerian musician, hostess and wife to the Nigerian surgeon Oni Akerele. At the time of her death, Akerele was "the oldest British national resident in Nigeria; she was also the grand dame of one of the most respected Yoruba families."

== Life ==
Dorothy Jackson was born in Dulwich, south London, the daughter of Ellis (Thompson) Jackson (1869–1989), a jazz musician of mixed African, European and Native American descent who later played with the Billy Cotton band. The family moved when she was seven to become the first black family in Brixton, then an affluent suburb. She played trombone and danced tap with her sister Bessie on the London stage.

In 1941 she married the Nigerian doctor John Oni Akerele. The couple's house in Kilburn hosted African activists such as Nnamdi Azikiwe and Jomo Kenyatta. After Nigerian independence in 1960, the family moved to Ibadan. They moved to Lagos during the Nigerian Civil War, establishing a private practice and clinic.

After Oni Akerele died in 1983, Dorothy lived with her youngest son, Richard, in Lagos. She enjoyed daily evening rides around Lagos, and weekly visits to Fela Kuti's nightclub Shrine. She died on 14 February 2007, aged 93.
