= Nasarawa State University =

Public university in Keffi, Nigeria

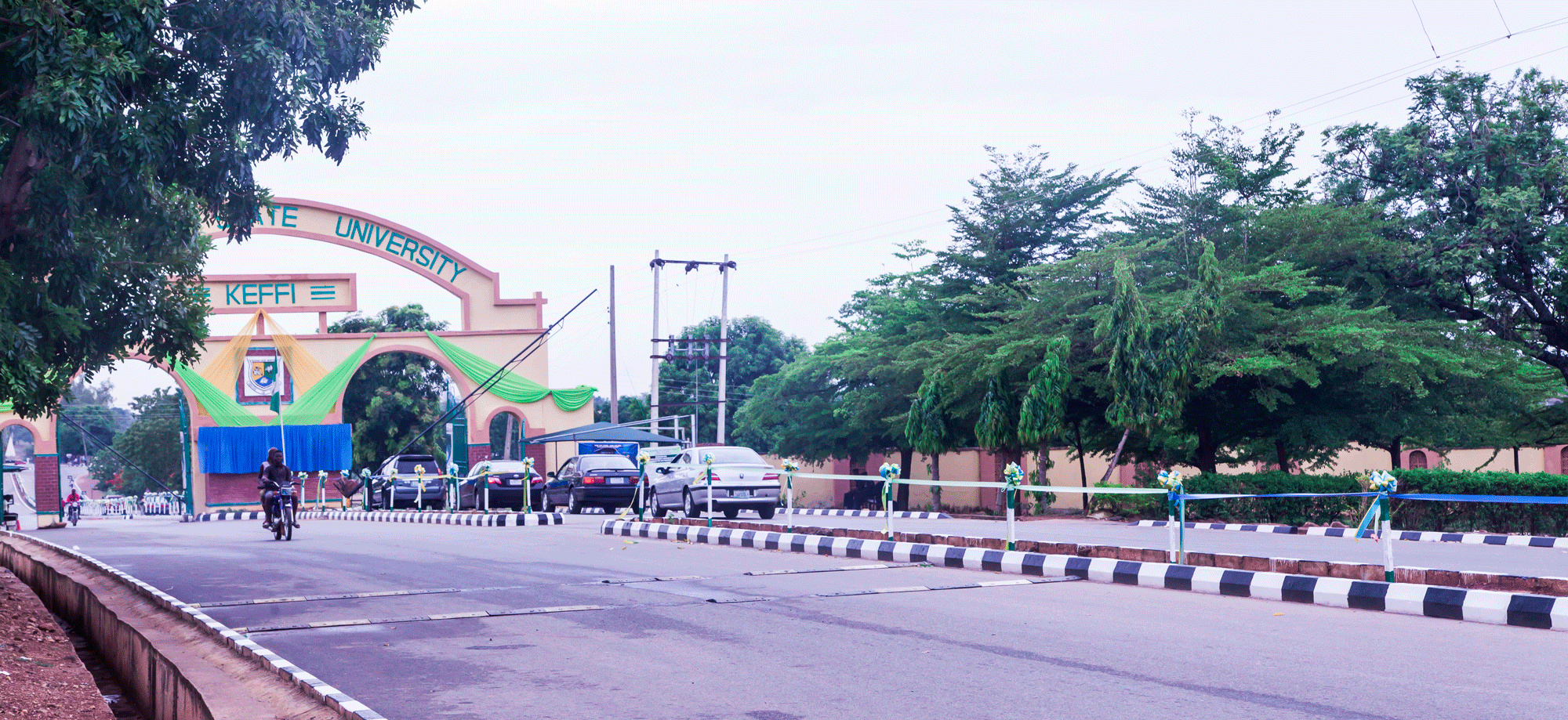
- Type: Public
- Established: 2001
- Vice-Chancellor: Saadatu Hassan Liman
- Location: Keffi, North Central Nigeria, Nasarawa State, Nigeria; 8.8471°N 7.8776°E
- Campus: Urban
- Website: nsuk.edu.ng

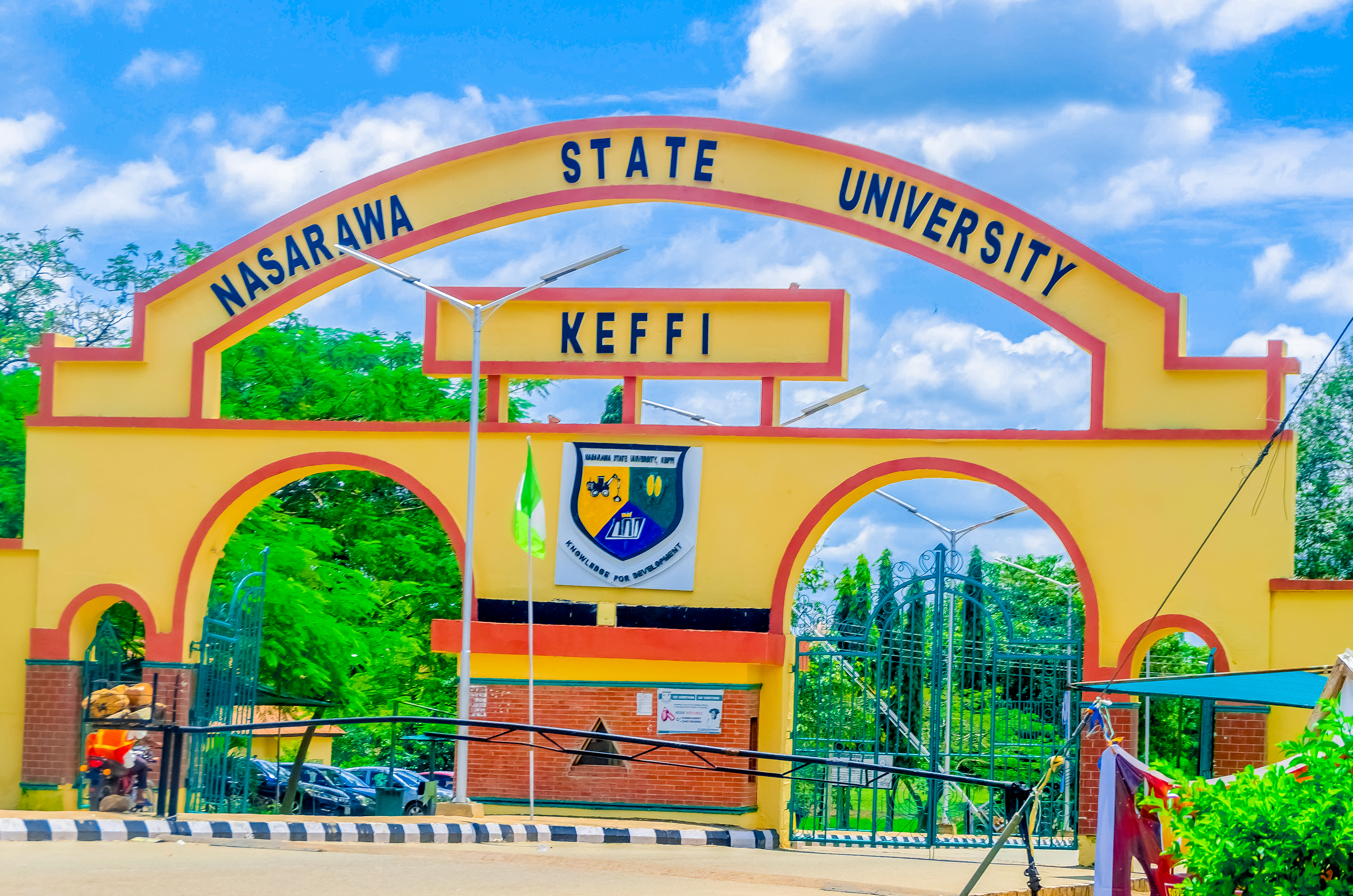
Gate_of_Nassarawa_State_University

Nasarawa State University is located in Keffi Nigeria. It is a tertiary institution which was created to encourage the advancement of learning in the state and its neighbouring environment.

NSUK was established under the Nasarawa State Law No. 2 of 2001 as passed by the State House of Assembly under the first democratically elected Governor of Nasarawa State, Governor (Dr.) Abdullahi Adamu but was born and sited in February 2002, at the defunct College of Arts, Science and Technology (CAST), Keffi.

It was established with the fundamental aim of providing an avenue for Nassarawa State indigenes to pursue and acquire tertiary education. Located in Keffi town. Nassarawa State University caters for both full-time and part-time students. The university has a Post Graduate Faculty which offers a Masters in Business Administration(MBA) under the department of Business Administration.

== Campus ==
The university has four campuses. The main campus is in Keffi which is the administrative headquarters of the institution, the senate of the school, the governing body, the vice chancellor, all the senior members of the senate and most faculties are at Keffi campus. The second campus is in Lafia the state capital where the faculty of agriculture is situated. The third campus is at Gudi where the faculty of engineering is domiciled, The last campus is located at Pyanku which is the center for continuing studies and IJMB.

== Faculties and Departments ==
=== Main campus (Keffi) ===
==== Faculty of Administration ====
- Business Administration
- Public Administration
- Accounting
- Banking and Finance
- Taxation
- Marketing
- Entrepreneurial Studies
- Security and Investment Management

==== Faculty of Arts ====
- History
- English Language
- Linguistic
- Religious Studies
- French Language
- Arabic Language
- Theater and Cultural Studies

==== Faculty of Social Sciences ====
- Mass Communication
- Political Science
- Economics
- Sociology
- Psychology

==== Faculty of Natural and Applied Sciences ====
- Biochemistry and Molecular Biology
- Physics
- Biological Sciences
- Chemistry
- Geology and Mining
- Mathematical Sciences
- Computer science
- zoology
- Plant science
- Statistics
- Science laboratory technology

==== Faculty of Education ====
- Arts and Social Sciences
- Educational Foundation
- Science Technology and Mathematics
- Special Education

==== Faculty of Law ====
- Private and Business Law
- Public and International Law
- Islamic Law and Jurispudence

==== Faculty of Environmental Science ====
- Geography
- Urban and Regional Planning
- Architecture
- Building Technology

=== Faculty of Health Science ===
- Community Health Science
- Health Information Management
- Environmental Health Science
- Nutrition and Dietetics

=== Lafia campus ===
==== Faculty of Agriculture ====
- Agronomy
- Agricultural Economics and Extension
- Animal Science
- Home Science and Management
- Forestry and Wildlife
- Fisheries

=== Gudi Campus ===
Faculty of engineering

- Civil Engineering
- Chemical Engineering
- Electrical and Electronics Engineering
- Mechanical Engineering
- Mining Engineering

== Notable staff ==
- Zaynab Alkali the writer, taught creative writing here.
- Epiphany Azinge taught law
- Terhemba Shija
- Muhammad Akaro Mainoma
- Ijeomah Henry Mmaduabuchi

== Notable alumni ==
- Sani Abdullahi Shinkafi, Nigerian politician
- Hajiya Hama Ali Muhammad, Nigerian Public Administrator
- Winifred Ekanem Oyo-Ita, former Head of the Civil Service of the Federation
