= International Association for Accounting Education & Research =

- Formation: 1984
- Type: Professional association
- Purpose: Support accountancy education and research
- Region served: Worldwide
- Official language: English
- President: Prof Gary Sundem
- Affiliations: International Federation of Accountants(IFAC)
- Website: http://www.iaaer.org/

The International Association for Accounting Education & Research (IAAER) is a non-profit organization that promotes excellence in accounting education and research. The organization also seeks to ensure that accounting academics make the maximum contribution to development of excellent accounting standards.

== Foundation ==
The origins of the IAAER can be traced back to meetings of the International Congresses on Accounting that started in 1904. The International Federation of Accountants began holding separate International Conferences on Accounting Education in 1962. IAAER was founded in 1984 to serve as a co-host with the Japanese Accounting Association for the sixth of these conferences, which was scheduled to be held in Kyoto, Japan in 1987. Its organization was defined at a meeting in Toronto, Canada on 17 August 1984, with representatives from Australia, Canada, Japan, Netherlands, Germany, the United States and the United Kingdom.

== Membership ==
IAAER offers institutional, university, individual, and student memberships. As of 2009, IAAER had about 50 institutional members, including professional accounting bodies such as the American Institute of Certified Public Accountants and accounting academic organizations such as the American Accounting Association. In 2009, IAAER announced that all members would have access to eIFRS, an online repository of material about International Financial Reporting Standards.

== Activities ==
IAAER contributes to international accounting and auditing standards through relationships with various international bodies, bringing a research-based academic viewpoint. Specifically, IAAER is represented on the International Accounting Education Standards Board (IAESB) of the International Federation of Accountants (IFAC), the Education Advisory Group of the International Accounting Standards Committee Foundation and the Standards Advisory Council of the International Accounting Standards Board (IASB).

IAAER commissions research projects to develop improvements to international accounting and educational standards, and promotes development of accounting skills by working with local and regional bodies and organizing conferences and workshops. For example, in 2006 IAAER and KPMG invited research proposals under the Defining, Recognizing and Measuring Liabilities Research Program. In November 2007, IAAER and the Association of Chartered Certified Accountants (ACCA) announced that they were providing up to five research grants of up to $25,000, funded by ACCA, to support the work of the IAESB. In July 2010 IAAER and ACCA again issued a call for proposals for research supporting development of international standards of education.

The IAAER sponsors and coordinates the World Congress of Accounting Educators and Researchers, which is held every four years in conjunction with IFAC World Congress. IAAER issues the COSMOS Accountancy Chronicle, a newsletter, supports the Journal of International Financial Management and Accounting and Accounting and Accounting Education: An International Journal, the official journals of the organization.
