= Muppala Sridhar =

- Occupations: Entrepreneur, Chairman of Tapasya College Of Commerce And Management, Chartered Accountant
- Awards: Times Education Icon Award,2017; Business Leader Award,2012 from the then chief minister of Andhra Pradesh Sri Kiran Kumar Reddy

Muppala Sridhar is an Entrepreneur, Chartered Accountant and a Educationist. He is the founder and chairman of Tapasya College Of Commerce And Management and Tapasya group of Institutions. He is the member of the 25th council of The Institute of Chartered Accountants of India (ICAI). He has been conferred with Business Leader Award,2012 from the then chief minister of Andhra Pradesh Sri Kiran Kumar Reddy.

== Education and career ==
Mupalla secured 4th rank in the state in class XII. He completed his graduation in B.Com., from Badruka college Commerce Arts. Later, he secured all India rank in CA intermediate. He is the founder and chairman of Tapasya group of institutions. He is a Chartered Accountant and the member of The Institute of Chartered Accountants of India (ICAI).

== Awards ==
- Times Education Icon, 2017
- Business Leader Award, 2012 from the then Chief Minister of Andhra Pradesh Sri Kiran Kumar Reddy
