= Chartered accountant (India) =

Professional designation

In India, a Chartered Accountant is a qualified accountant of the Institute of Chartered Accountants of India. They are experts in various subjects, including accounting, auditing, corporate law, costing, and taxation, and can choose to work independently or with a firm.

The Institute of Chartered Accountants of India (ICAI) was formed as a body of registered accountants in 1949. To become a Chartered Accountant, one must clear all three levels of the Chartered Accountancy course and the Articleship (Practical Training).

== Qualification process ==
Enrolment in the Chartered Accountancy course can be initiated after successfully completing examinations set by a secondary education body recognised by the Government of India. It has three levels of examination: the CA Foundation, Intermediate, and Final courses, of which CA Foundation and Intermediate are conducted thrice a year (Jan, May and Sep) and CA Final conducted twice (May and Sep).

Interested individuals are eligible to sit the first round of examinations four months after enrolling in the CA Foundation. They must then register for the CA Intermediate and complete an orientation program and information technology training. Following this, they must complete a two-year-long articleship under a practicing Chartered Accountant or a Chartered Accountancy firm, working 35 hours a week. They may then appear for the CA Final examination six months after finishing the same and participate in two short courses.

Students with a Bachelor's degree may directly sit for the CA Intermediate exams eight months after registering for the course, so long as they have graduated with an aggregate of 55-60% from a UGC-recognised educational institution.

== Responsibilities ==
A Chartered Accountant in India typically:

- Offers advice in financial planning.
- Handles budgets and other financial systems.
- Advises on treasury and tax-related matters.
- Completes financial audits annually.
- Prepares financial statements.
- Liaisons with internal and external auditors.
- Performs forensic accounting and fraud detection activities.

== Registration and Examination Fee ==
The fee structure for self-studying students is:

Level	Registration Fees
CA Foundation	INR 9,000
Orientation and IT training	INR 13,500
CA Intermediate	INR 18,000
Articleship	INR 2,000
Direct Entry	INR 34,000
Advanced IT training and MCS	INR 14,500
CA Final	INR 22,000

The examination fees for the foundation, intermediate, and final courses are Rs 1,500, Rs 2,700, and Rs 3,300, respectively.

== Recognition ==
Chartered Accountants are eligible to complete a postdoctoral diploma at universities in India as they are considered equivalent to postgraduates by the UGC. In recent years, there has been a surge of opportunities available to CA graduates, though the placement rate remains between 30 and 35%.

== See also ==
- Institute of Chartered Accountants of India.
