= Sanjay Tandon =

Indian politician (born 1963)

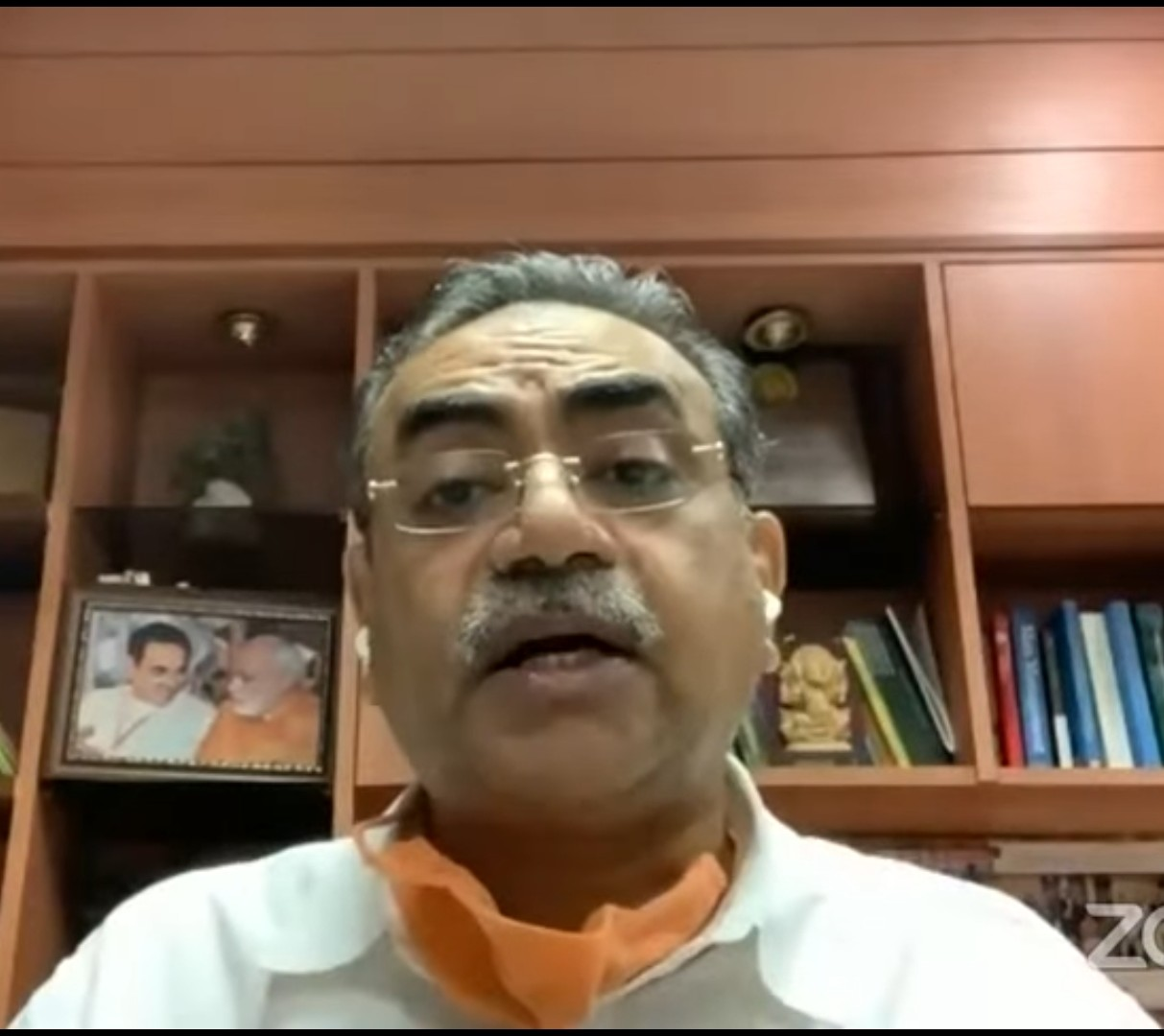
- Born: 10 September 1963 (age 62); Amritsar, PB, India
- Education: Panjab University (B Com); ICAI (CA); ICMAI (CMA)
- Political party: Bhartiya Janata Party
- Spouse: Priya S Tandon

Sanjay Tandon (born 10 September 1963) is an Indian politician in the Bhartiya Janata Party.

His father Balramji Das Tandon was the former Governor of Chhattisgarh and prominent BJP leader in Punjab. His father-in-law was Justice Madan Mohan Punchhi who retired as Chief Justice of India in 1998. He has authored his father's biography titled "Balramji Dass Tandon: Ek Prerak Charitra". He is also the author of an inspirational story book series called "Sunrays" which is foreworded by many major BJP leaders, including Narendra Modi.

== Education ==
Tandon completed his high school education from DAV Senior Secondary School, Sector 8 in Chandigarh. Following which, Tandon did his B.Com. (with Hons. in Accountancy) from Post Graduate Government College - 11, Chandigarh (then known as Government College for Men), Chandigarh; affiliated to Panjab University, Chandigarh. He became a Chartered Accountant in 1986 and Cost Accountant in 1988.

== Positions ==
He is currently a member of the following organizations.

1. A member of the Administrator's Advisory Council, Chandigarh Administration.
2. Chairman – Standing committee of Administrators Advisory Council on Sports Management Chandigarh Administration
3. A member of D.A.V. Management Committee Pratinidhi Sabha
4. Governing Council Member, Women's Premier League (WPL), BCCI

Tandon also owns an NGO by the name of Competent Foundation.

== Political career ==
Tandon's political career began in 1991 when he was made the in-charge of the Lok Sabha election in the Amritsar constituency for BJP. In 1993, he played the role of the election in-charge of the Lok Sabha election for the BJP from Jalandhar constituency. Tandon was made a member of the BJP Executive in Chandigarh in 1995. In 1997, he was made the in-charge of the Assembly election for BJP from the Rajpura constituency (Punjab)

Tandon was made the convener of the Chartered Accounts Cell of BJP Chandigarh In 2002, he was made the in-charge of Assembly elections for BJP in the Rajpura constituency (Punjab) In 2007, Tandon took over as the General Secretary of BJP Chandigarh Tandon launched the monthly magazine of the party called 'Chandigarh Kamal Samachar' in 2009. In the year 2009, He was made the in-charge of the Lok Sabha election when Satya Pal Jain contested from the Chandigarh seat for BJP.

In January 2010, Tandon was selected as the State President of BJP Chandigarh Tandon was re-instated as the State President of BJP Chandigarh in January 2013 till 2020, following which, he was made the co-incharge for Himachal Pradesh He was BJP's candidate for the 2024 Lok Sabha elections from Chandigarh, replacing incumbent MP Kirron Kher.

== Book writing ==
Tandon has co-authored seven books with his wife Priya S. Tandon. Each of the books in the Sunrays series contain 52 inspirational short stories.

Name of Book	Foreword written by
Sunrays for Sunday	Balramji Dass Tandon and Justice Madan Mohan Punchhi
Sunrays for Monday	Balramji Dass Tandon and Justice Madan Mohan Punchhi
Sunrays for Tuesday	Arun Jaitley, KV Kamath (MD & CEO ICICI Bank), Mukesh Ambani
Sunrays for Wednesday	Narendra Modi, OP Bhatt (Chairman SBI), Sunil Kant Munjal
Sunrays for Thursday	Sushma Swaraj, MK Kaw (Former Education Sec)
Sunrays for Friday	Mohan Bhagwat ji, Justice Jagdish Khehar and Nimish Pandeya
Sunrays for Saturday	Piyush Goyal, Vijay Shekhar Sharma (Founder Paytm) and Deep Kalra (Founder MakeMyTrip)

He has also authored his father's biography titled 'Balramji Das Tandon – Ek Prerak Charitra'. The foreword for the same has been written by K. C. Sudarshan, Atal Bihari Vajpayee, L.K. Advani, Rajnath Singh, Prakash Singh Badal, Narendra Modi, Murli Manohar Joshi, M. Venkaiah Naidu, Arun Jaitley, Balbir Punj
