= Y. H. Malegam =

Indian chartered accountant

Yezdi Hirji Malegam

President of ICAI
- Succeeded by: V Rajaraman

Personal details
- Occupation: Chartered Accountant

Yezdi Hirji Malegam is an Indian chartered accountant who was the president of Institute of Chartered Accountants of India from 1979 to 1980. He was the chairman of National Advisory Committee on Accounting Standards. Since 27 November 2000, he has been a board member of Reserve Bank of India and holds a position as a trustee of The Willingdon Sports Club. He is also engaged in various other fields of business and finance. He has been a director of the Indian Central Bank's board for 17 years.

== Review of Disclosure Requirements ==
Malegam lead a 1995 review of disclosure requirements for public issues. Under his recommendation, guidelines were produced by SEBI, which included the recommendation such as companies declaring loans to subsidy companies.

== Study of Issues and Concerns in the MFI Sector ==
Malegam was appointed Chairman of the famous Malegam Committee (Sub-Committee of the RBI Central Board of Directors) set up to study issues and concerns in the MFI Sector. The committee submitted its report to the RBI in January 2011. Malegam contended that the micro-finance institutions have neglected the poor.

== Financial sector and accounting reforms ==
Malegam was member of the Financial Sector Legislative Reforms Commission set up in 2011 to amend the financial laws in India. However, Malegam submitted a dissenting note to the Commission's Report, arguing that Reserve Bank of India should control all capital flows except FDI.

== Awards and honours ==
Malegam received Padma Shri Award (the fourth highest civilian award in the Republic of India) in 2012.

== See also ==
- Malegam - a brief profile
- Executive Profile & Biography of Malegam
