= 2024 Indian general election in Chandigarh =

2024 Indian political election in UT of Chandigarh

- 1 June 2024

Sole seat from Chandigarh in the Lok Sabha
- Opinion polls
- Turnout: 67.98% (▼2.63%)
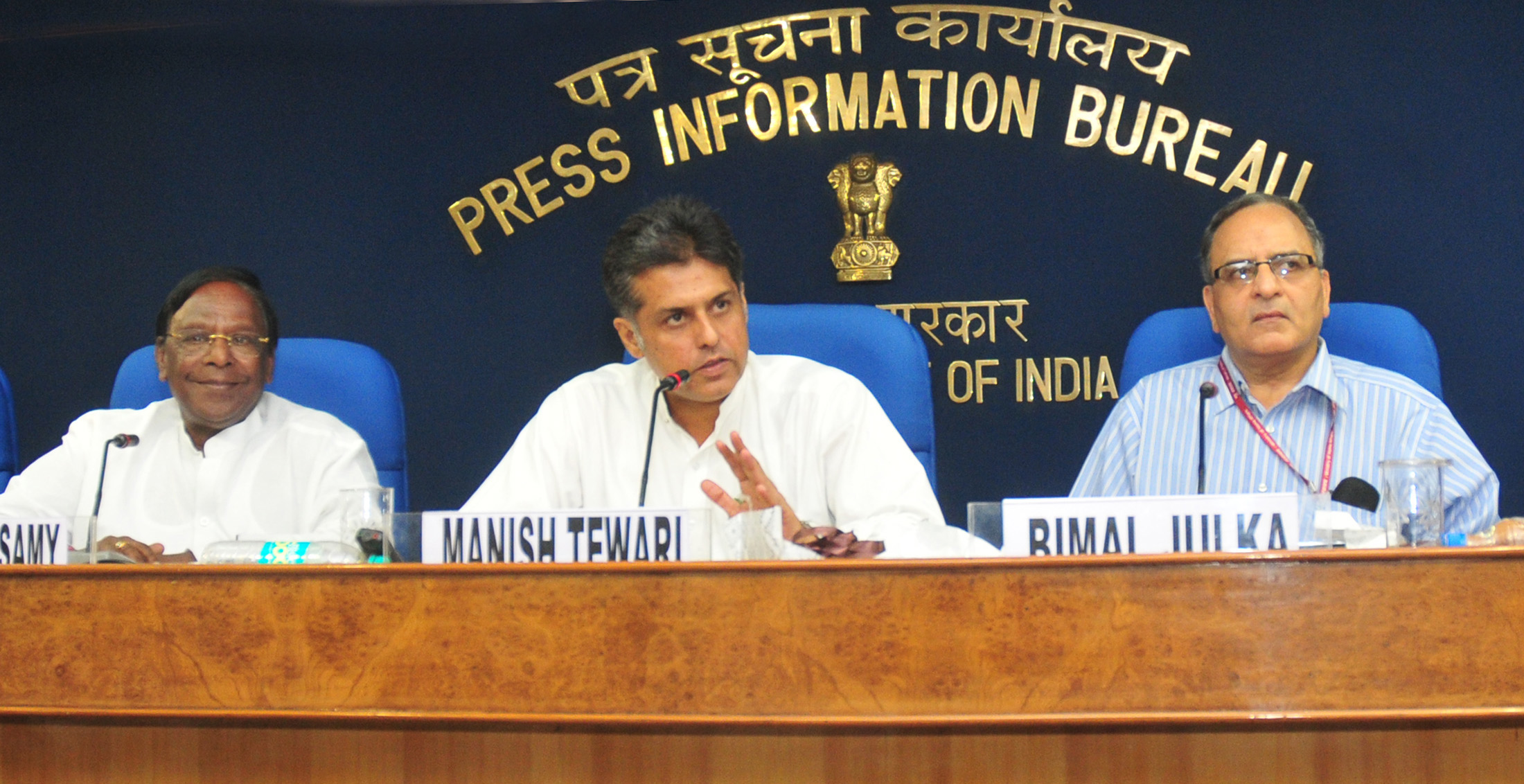

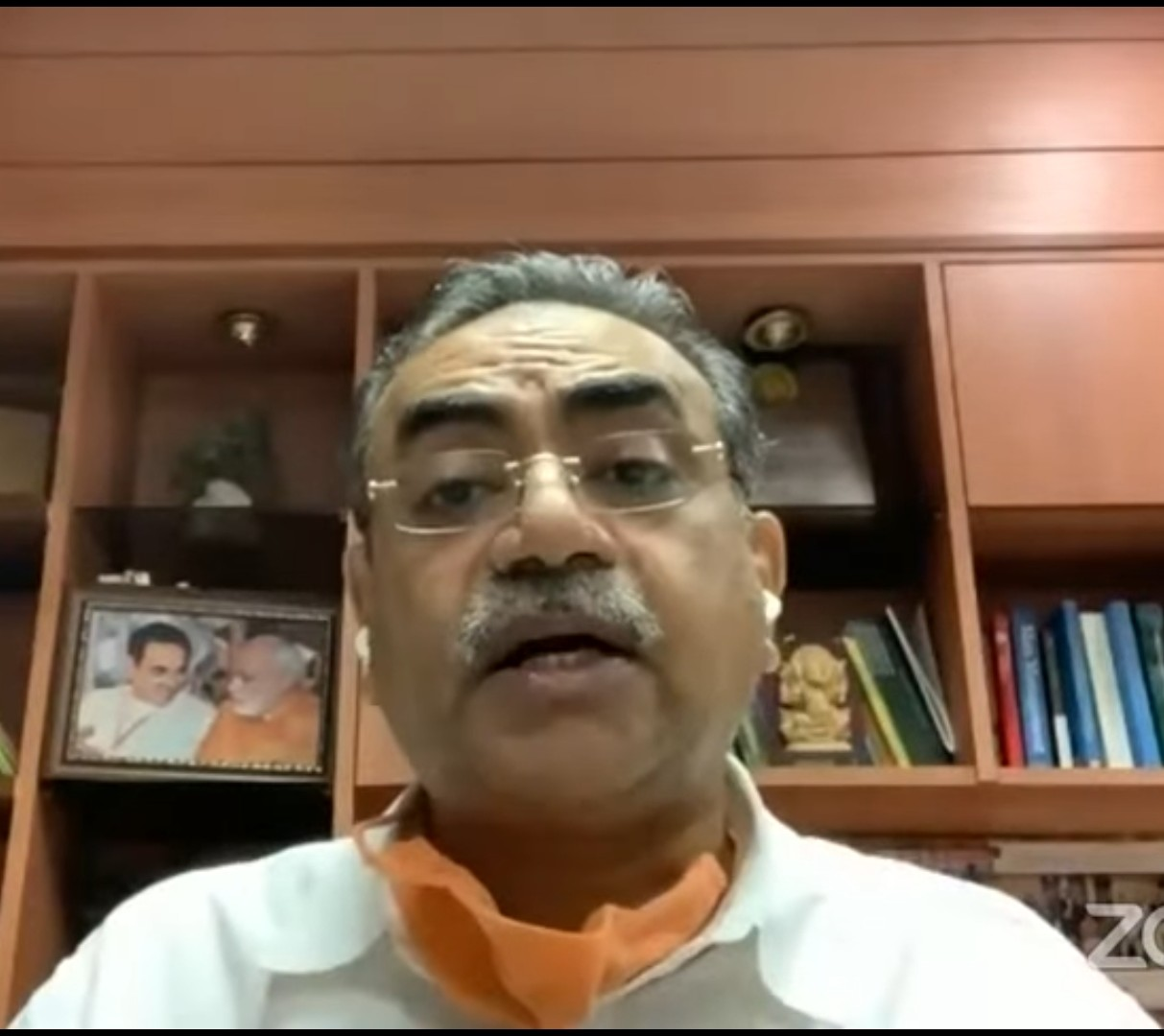
| | First party | Second party |
|---|---|---|
| Leader | Manish Tewari | Sanjay Tandon |
| Party | INC | BJP |
| Alliance | INDIA | NDA |
| Leader since | 2024 | 2019 |
| Leader's seat | Chandigarh | Chandigarh |
| Last election | 40.35%, 0 seat (Pawan Kumar Bansal) | 50.64%, 1 seat (Kirron Anupam Kher) |
| Seats won | 1 | 0 |
| Seat change | ▲1 | ▼1 |
| Popular vote | 216,657 | 214,153 |
| Percentage | 48.23% | 47.66% |
| Swing | ▲7.88 pp | ▼2.98 pp |
- Chandigarh Lok Sabha constituency
Prime Minister before election
Narendra Modi
BJP
Prime Minister after election
Narendra Modi
BJP

The 2024 Indian general election was held in Chandigarh on 1 June 2024 to elect 1 member of the 18th Lok Sabha.

== Election schedule ==
| Poll event | Phase |
|---|---|
| Poll event | VII |
| Notification date | 7 May |
| Last date for filing nomination | 14 May |
| Scrutiny of nomination | 15 May |
| Last Date for withdrawal of nomination | 17 May |
| Date of poll | 1 June |
| Date of counting of votes/Result | 4 June 2024 |
| No. of constituencies | 1 |

== Parties and alliances ==
=== National Democratic Alliance ===
National Democratic Alliance

| Party | Flag | Symbol | Leader | Seats contested |
|---|---|---|---|---|
| Bharatiya Janata Party | | | Sanjay Tandon | 1 |

=== Indian National Developmental Inclusive Alliance ===
Indian National Developmental Inclusive Alliance

| Party | Flag | Symbol | Leader | Seats contested |
|---|---|---|---|---|
| Indian National Congress | | | Manish Tewari | 1 |

== Candidates ==
| Constituency | | | | | |
| Constituency | | NDA | | INDIA | |
| 1 | Chandigarh | BJP | Sanjay Tandon | INC | Manish Tewari |

== Surveys and polls ==
=== Opinion polls ===
| Polling agency | Date published | Margin of error | | | | Lead |
| Polling agency | Date published | Margin of error | NDA | INDIA | Others | Lead |
| ABP News-CVoter | April 2024 | ±5% | 1 | 0 | 0 | NDA |
| ABP News-CVoter | March 2024 | ±5% | 1 | 0 | 0 | NDA |
| Times Now-ETG | December 2023 | ±3% | 1 | 0 | 0 | NDA |
| India TV-CNX | October 2023 | ±3% | 1 | 0 | 0 | NDA |
| Times Now-ETG | September 2023 | ±3% | 1 | 0 | 0 | NDA |
| Times Now-ETG | August 2023 | ±3% | 1 | 0 | 0 | NDA |

| Polling agency | Date published | Margin of error | | | | Lead |
| Polling agency | Date published | Margin of error | NDA | INDIA | Others | Lead |
| ABP News-CVoter | March 2024 | ±5% | 51% | 44% | 5% | 6 |

=== Exit polls ===
| Polling agency | | | | Lead |
| Polling agency | NDA | INDIA | Others | Lead |
| Actual results | 0 | 1 | 0 | INDIA |

== Voter turnout ==
| Constituency | | Poll date | Turnout | Swing |
|---|---|---|---|---|
| 1 | Chandigarh | 1 June 2024 | 67.98% | 2.63%▼ |

== Results ==
=== Results by alliance or party ===
| Alliance/ Party | | Popular vote | | | Seats | | |
| Alliance/ Party | | Votes | % | ±pp | Contested | Won | +/− |
|---|---|---|---|---|---|---|---|
| INDIA | INC | 2,16,657 | 48.23 | ▲7.88 | 1 | 1 | ▲1 |
| NDA | BJP | 2,14,153 | 47.66 | ▼2.98 | 1 | 0 | ▼1 |
| Others | | | | | 5 | 0 | Steady |
| IND | | | | | 12 | 0 | Steady |
| NOTA | | 2,912 | 0.65 | ▼0.30 | | | |
| Total | | | 100% | - | | 1 | - |

=== Results by constituency ===
| Constituency | | Turnout | Winner | | | | | Runner-up | | | | | Margin | |
| Constituency | | Turnout | Party | Alliance | Candidate | Votes | % | Party | Alliance | Candidate | Votes | % | Votes | % |
|---|---|---|---|---|---|---|---|---|---|---|---|---|---|---|
| 1 | Chandigarh | 67.98%▼ | INC | INDIA | Manish Tewari | 2,16,657 | 48.23% | BJP | NDA | Sanjay Tandon | 2,14,153 | 47.67% | 2,504 | 0.56% |

== See also ==
- 2024 Indian general election in Chhattisgarh
- 2024 Indian general election in Dadra and Nagar Haveli and Daman and Diu
- 2024 Indian general election in Delhi
