= V Rajaraman =

Institute of Chartered Accountants of India

President, XIth Council
- In office 1980–1981
- Preceded by: Y. H. Malegam
- Succeeded by: Bansi S. Mehta

Personal details
- Born: 16 September 1929 (age 97) India
- Occupation: Chartered Accountant

V. Rajaraman (born September 1929) is an Indian chartered accountant who was the President of Institute of Chartered Accountants of India from 1980 to 1981. Currently, he is a senior Partner in Thakur, Vaidyanath Aiyar & Co., New Delhi.

== Biography ==
V. Rajaraman was born on 16 September 1929 in Kerala, India. He was elected as second president of the XIth Council (1979–82) of Institute of Chartered Accountants of India in 1980 and inaugurated the Trichur Branch (Thrissur City) of the Institute of Chartered Accountants of India on 10 June 1981.

In 2006, he became a member of the task force constituted to consider challenges involved and to prepare a road map for the possibilities of converging / adoption of the International Financial Reporting Standards (IFRS) in the Indian context. Later, he became a member of the Special Group for formulating Institutes' response to the various recommendations as contained in the Report of the Parliamentary Standing Committee on Finance on Companies Bill 2009. He also headed the Bureaucracy Today Assessment Committee constituted in February 2014, for compiling the list of top 100 CA firms.

He has audited multiple Indian companies including some public sector undertakings like IFCI Ltd and Air India.

His article titled Where There are Opportunities for Profession, Growth Will Follow was published in ICAI e-Journal.

Amarjit Chopra referred to him as his role model in his presidential address in 2010.

== See also ==
- Rameshwar Thakur
