= G. Ramaswamy =

CA. G.Ramaswamy
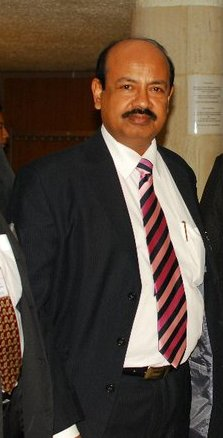
- Born: India
- Notable credit: Past President of ICAI,
- Title: Chartered Accountant

CA. G. Ramaswamy is an Indian Chartered Accountant from Tamil Nadu (Coimbatore) and was the president of the Institute of Chartered Accountants of India (ICAI) for the year 2011–12.

== Career ==
Ramaswamy qualified as a Chartered Accountant in 1984. From 1984-1989 he was a member of the Managing Committee of the Coimbatore Branch of the Southern India Regional Council (SIRC) of the ICAI and was Chairman of that branch from 1988-1989. He became a council member of the Southern India Regional Council (SIRC) of ICAI in 1994 while serving as Director of the Tamil Nadu Industrial Investment Corporation Ltd. (which was a concern run by the Tamil Nadu government). From 1999-2000, he served as the Chairman of the SIRC. During that time SIRC received the best Regional Council award and Best Students Association award. He was also a member of the Board of Governors of the Institute of Internal Auditors [IIA]-Chennai. Ramaswamy began working directly for the ICAI in 2004 and has been on standing and non standing committees. Formerly vice president of the ICAI for 2010–2011, Ramaswamy is also a fellow member of the Institute of Company Secretaries of India (ICSI) and represents the ICAI on a number of advisory committees including the National Advisory Committee on Accounting Standards (NACAS).

He has been nominated to the Standing Committee on TDS for the year 2011 for such things as enhancing voluntary TDS/TCS compliance.

He has also been nominated as a member of the 2nd Quality Review Board constituted by the Government of India.

He is a member of the SAFA task force, a member of the SAFA Committee for improvement in Transparency, Accountability and Governance and Vice Chairman in the SAFA Centre of Excellence on Standards and Quality Control.

Preceded by Amarjit Chopra	President of the ICAI; 2010–2011	Succeeded by CA. Jaydeep N. Shah
