= Srichand Goyal =

Indian politician

Member of Parliament, India
- In office March 1967 – December 1970
- Opponent: Amar Nath Vidyalankar
- Succeeded by: Amar Nath Vidyalankar
- Constituency: Chandigarh, India

Personal details
- Born: 15 August 1915 Village Kaimbla, Karnal, Undivided Punjab, India
- Party: Bharatiya Jan Sangh
- Education: BA, LLB.

Shrichand Goyal (also known as Chand Goyal) was an Indian politician, who was the first Member of Parliament to be elected from Chandigarh Parliamentary Constituency in 1967. A member of the Bharatiya Jana Sangh (BJS), he was a parliamentarian from March 1967 to December 1970.

== Early life ==
Born in village Kaimbla in Karnal, in Punjab Province (British India), on 15 August 1915, he was educated at Ramjas High School, Delhi; St. Stephen's College, Delhi, Delhi; and Law College, Delhi. He married Pushpa Lata Goyal on 14 March 1956.

== Political life ==
As a founding member of the All India Jan Sangh, he also served as the Secretary and Vice-president of the Punjab Jan Sangh. He was a member of the Punjab Legislative Council twice (February 1958 - April 1960, and April 1964 - October 1966). He also served as Chairman of the Petitions Committee; Member, Committee on Government Assurances; and Member. Public Accounts Committee and the Estimates Committee. In the elections for the Chandigarh (Lok Sabha constituency) held in March 1967, Goyal bagged 23,393 votes and overcame Amar Nath Vidyalankar of the Congress who had 11,323 votes. Harbans Singh Gujral of the Swatantra Party came third. However, in 1971, Goyal's vote fell to 16,854 votes and he lost to Amar Nath Vidyalankar who secured 48,335 votes.

An advocate, he was imprisoned during the Emergency.

== Family ==
He is survived by his wife Pushpa Lata Goyal and two sons Parveen Goyal and Sanjay Goyal, both of whom are advocates. Former Bharatiya Janata Party (BJP) Member of Parliament Satya Pal Jain began his career as an apprentice under Srichand Goyal. Goyal also served as President of the District Bar Association, Sangrur.

== Memorial ==
The auditorium of the BJP Headquarters in Sector 33, Chandigarh is named after Chand Goyal.
