= Pawan Kumar Bansal =

Indian politician (born 1948)

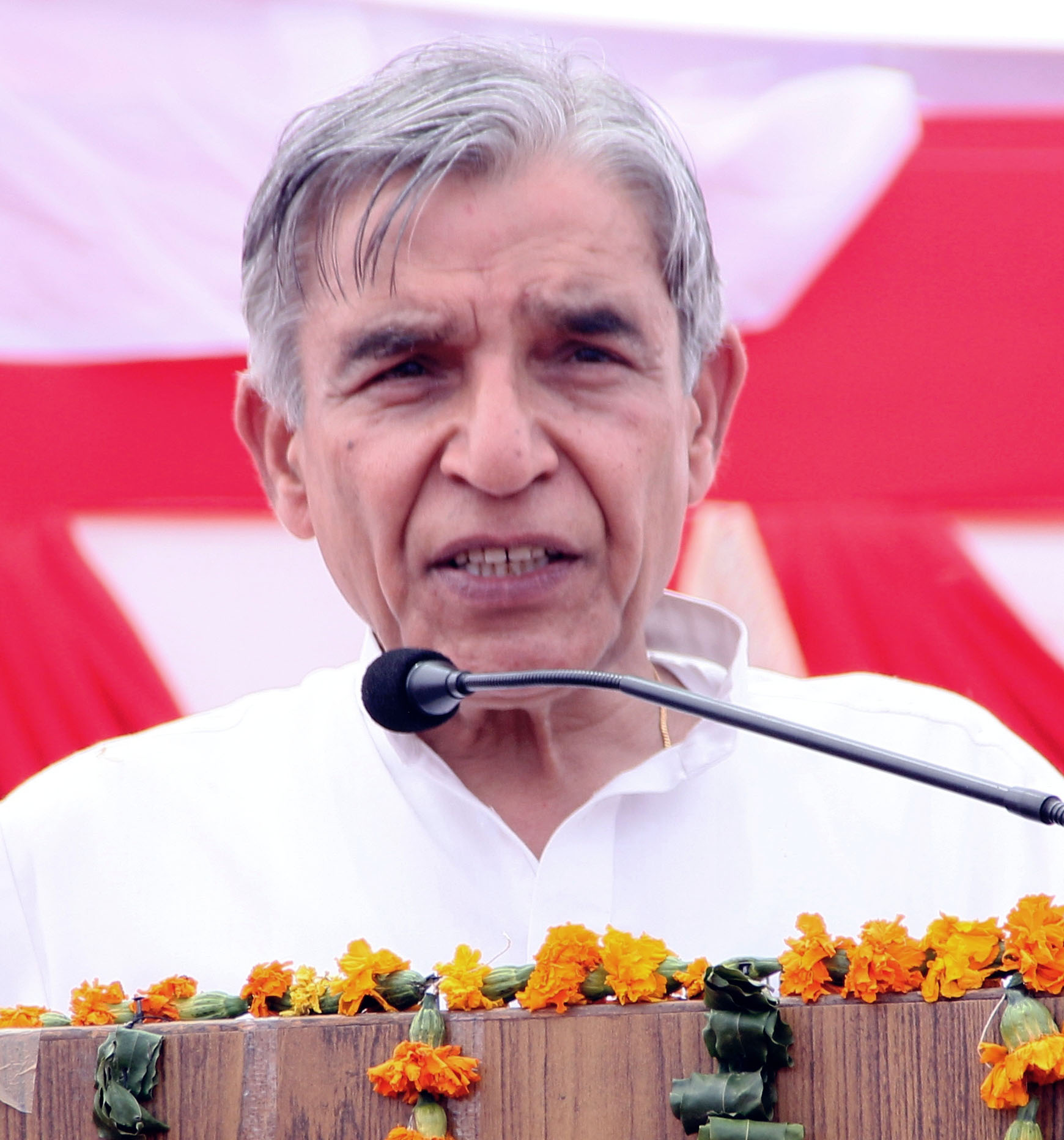
- Bansal in 2013

Treasurer of the All India Congress Committee
- Interim
- In office 28 November 2020 – 1 Oct 2023
- Preceded by: Ahmed Patel
- Succeeded by: Ajay Maken

Union Minister of Railways
- In office 28 October 2012 – 10 May 2013
- Prime Minister: Manmohan Singh
- Preceded by: C. P. Joshi
- Succeeded by: C. P. Joshi

Union Minister of Parliamentary Affairs
- In office 28 May 2009 – 28 October 2012
- Prime Minister: Manmohan Singh
- Preceded by: Ghulam Nabi Azad
- Succeeded by: Kamal Nath

Union Minister of Water Resources
- In office 12 July 2011 – 28 October 2012
- Prime Minister: Manmohan Singh
- Preceded by: Salman Khurshid
- Succeeded by: Harish Rawat
- In office 14 June 2009 – 19 January 2011
- Prime Minister: Manmohan Singh
- Preceded by: Manmohan Singh
- Succeeded by: Salman Khurshid

Union Minister of Science and Technology; Union Minister of Earth Sciences
- In office 19 January 2011 – 12 July 2011
- Prime Minister: Manmohan Singh
- Preceded by: Kapil Sibal
- Succeeded by: Vilasrao Deshmukh

Member of Parliament, Lok Sabha
- In office 6 October 1999 – 16 May 2014
- Preceded by: Satya Pal Jain
- Succeeded by: Kirron Kher
- Constituency: Chandigarh
- In office 20 June 1991 – 10 May 1996
- Preceded by: Harmohan Dhawan
- Succeeded by: Satya Pal Jain

Personal details
- Born: 16 July 1948 (age 78) Sunam, East Punjab, India
- Party: Indian National Congress
- Spouse: Madhu Bansal
- Children: 2 sons
- As of 28 May, 2009

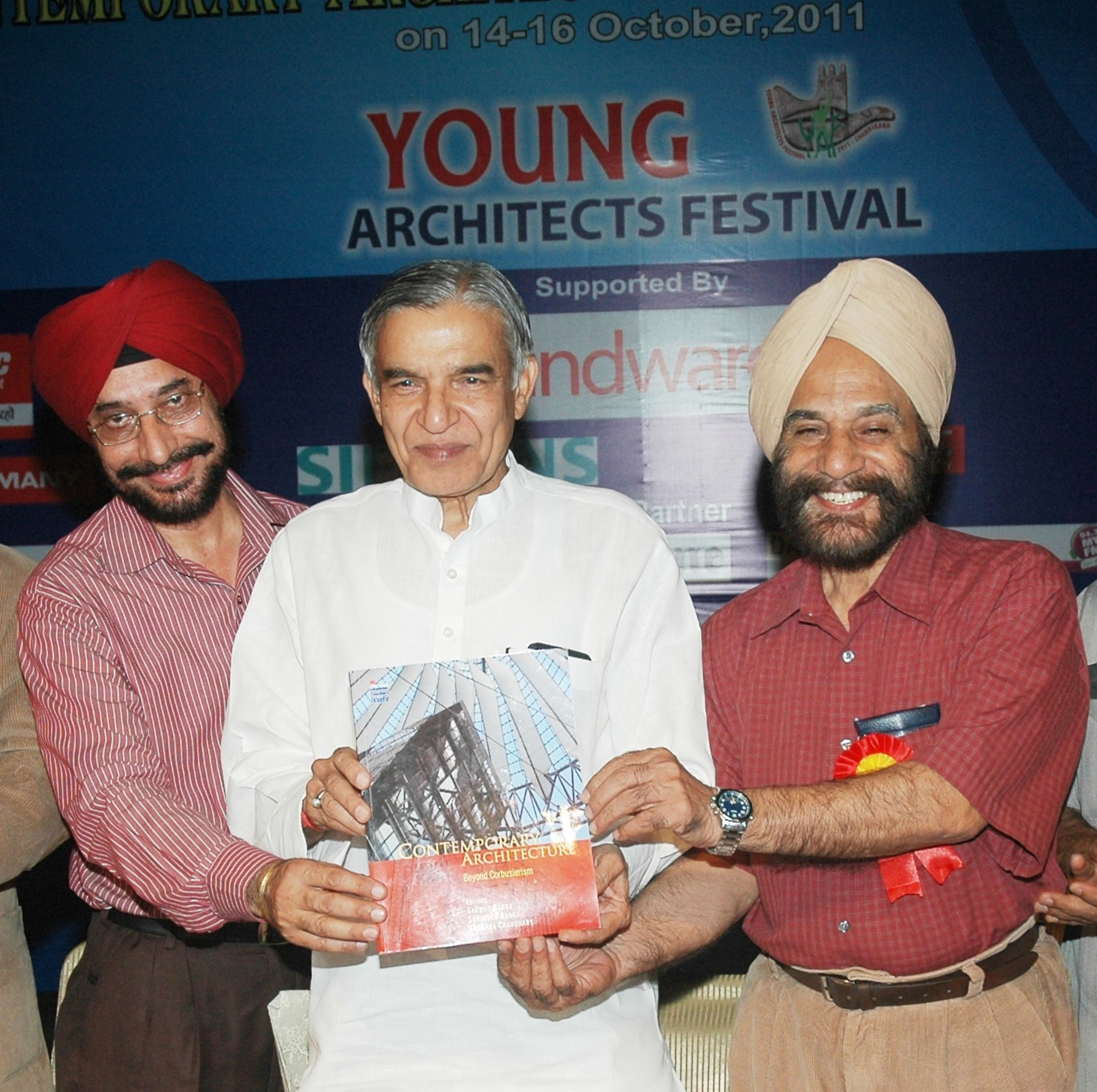
Pawan Kumar Bansal launched a book in the Young Architects Festival held at Chandigarh on 14–16 October 2011. Also seen in the picture are Dr SS Bhatti (R) and Architect Sarbjit Bahga (L).

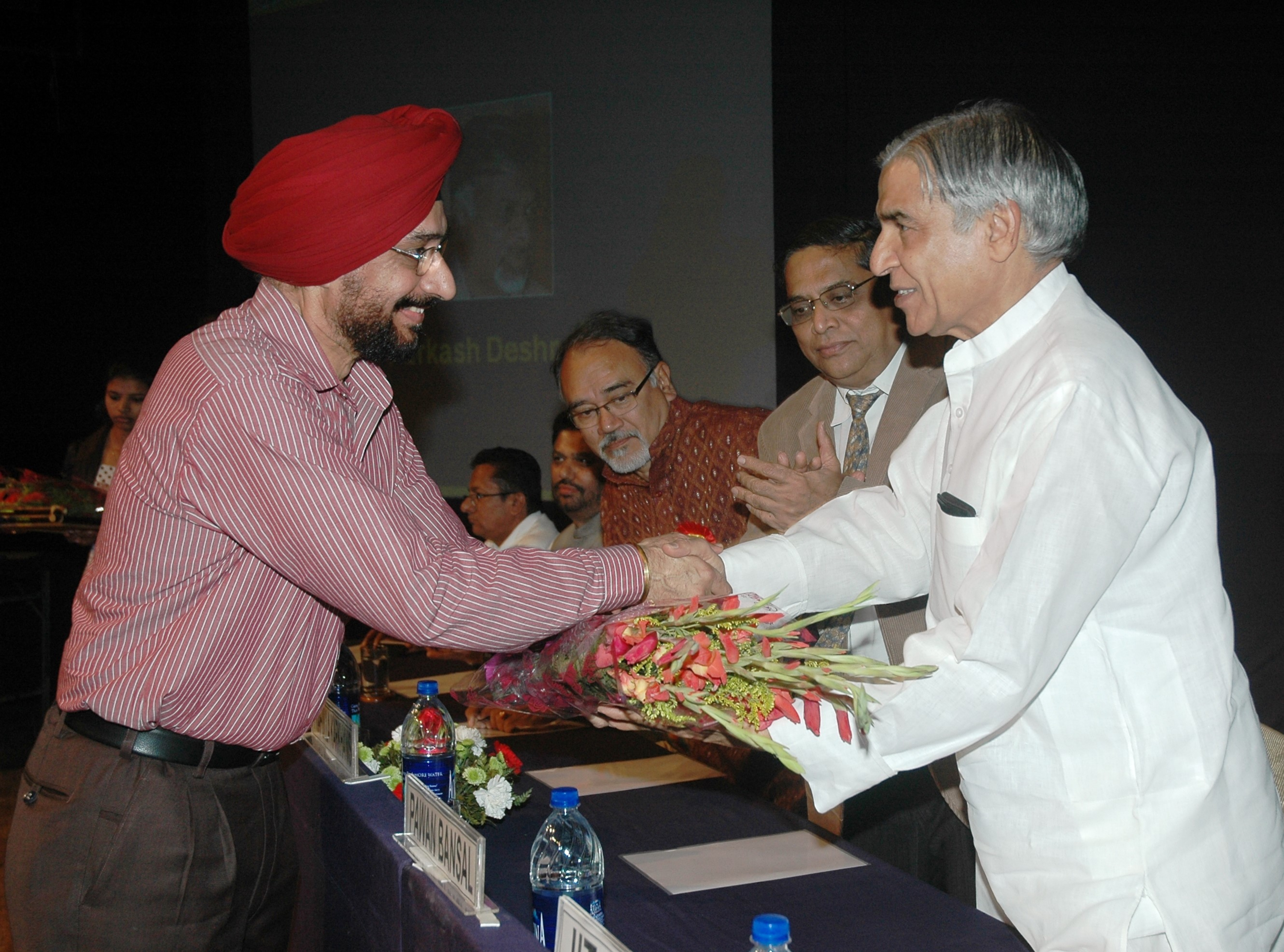
Pawan Kumar Bansal was welcomed by Architect Sarbjit Bahga to the Young Architects Festival held at Chandigarh on 14–16 October 2011.

Pawan Kumar Bansal (born 16 July 1948) is an Indian National Congress politician, who was appointed the interim treasurer in November 2020 and a former minister in the Manmohan Singh government. He represented Chandigarh constituency in the 15th Lok Sabha (2009-2014) of India. He served as Minister of Railways from 28 October 2012 to 10 May 2013.

== Early life ==
Bansal was born on 16 July 1948 in Sunam. His family hailed from Tapa, Punjab. He went to school at the Yadavindra Public School, Patiala, and did BSc from the Post Graduate Government College, Sector 11, Chandigarh. He also holds an LLB degree from the Department of Law, Panjab University, Chandigarh.

== Career ==
Bansal has represented Chandigarh as a member of Parliament in the 10th, 13th, 14th and 15th Lok Sabha. He has worked as the Minister of Parliamentary Affairs and the Minister of Water Resources in the Second Manmohan Singh ministry. He also held the charge of the Minister of State for Finance and Parliamentary Affairs in the First Manmohan Singh Cabinet.

=== Railway Minister ===
He took over as the Railway Minister, becoming the first from his party since 1996. Soon after becoming Railways minister, he approved an increase in fares, which had been unchanged for the last 15 years, to allow the Indian Railways to be profitable. He contested the 2014 Lok Sabha Elections from Chandigarh. He contested his former constituency again in the next election but was once again defeated.

== Railway Budget 2013 ==
The 2013 Railway Budget focused on improving the condition of Indian Railways. Pawan Bansal came up with first ever rail link to connect Arunachal Pradesh. Internet ticketing from 0030 hours to 2330 hours as well as E-ticketing through mobile phones was made available. Four companies of women RPF personnel set up and another 8 to be set up to strengthen the security of rail passengers, especially women passengers. Indian Railways has identified 104 stations for upgradation in cities with more than one million population and of religious significance. This means, these stations the Railways will give attention to all aspects related to cleanliness, according to the Budget highlights the government released. 179 escalators and 400 lifts at A-1 and other major stations to be installed facilitating elderly and differently-able.

== Personal life ==
He is married to Madhu Bansal. They have two sons.

== Incident of corruption charges ==
On 3 May 2013, the CBI arrested his nephew, Vijay Singla, after they caught an aide counting two bags of cash. After the scam came to light in May, the CBI interrogated Pawan Kumar Bansal, for ten hours, but failed to find substantial evidence to nail him. In his statement, Bansal denied having any knowledge of his nephew's activities.

CBI does not have any tapped conversation which shows that former Railway Minister Pawan Kumar Bansal was involved in or had any knowledge of the Rs 10 crore cash for post bribery scandal, which prompted the agency not to make him an accused in the case, sources said here today.

The CBI said that Mr Bansal will serve as prosecution witness. The judge has responded. "If the CBI has chosen to make Mr Bansal a witness, then at this juncture, there being no evidence against him, the court cannot pass any order or question him, except during the trial."

Political offices
| Preceded by C. P. Joshi | Minister of Railways; 28 Oct 2012 – 10 May 2013 | Succeeded by C. P. Joshi |
| Preceded by Vayalar Ravi | Minister of Parliamentary Affairs; 2009-12 | Succeeded by Kamal Nath |
| Unknown | Minister of Water Resources unknown | Succeeded by Harish Rawat |
