= CA Intermediate Course =

Indian accountcy exam

CA Intermediate is the second level exam, of a course in India, Chartered Accountancy. It has six subjects and over 7000 pages of study material that a student is expected to cover in the nine months study period allotted to them.

The group system is what makes this exam even more difficult, as a group consists of three subjects, and a candidate has to pass all three papers in order to clear the group. Failure to pass in one subject immediately results in the failure of the entire group, which would mean that the student fails in the subjects in which he has passed.

The average passing percentage up to the year 2020 has been 16.76% only, which means only 4 out of every 25 students appearing for the exam manage to pass it. That being said, the least passing percentage was just 8.88% in the attempt of November 2018 Chartered Accountancy Course in India.

== Eligibility ==
Students after clearing the Common Proficiency Test (CPT) or CA Foundation Course become eligible to register for the CA Intermediate. Alternatively, graduates, postgraduates or students having equivalent degrees can directly register for the CA Intermediate exam without appearing for the entry level exams.

== Test model ==
It is a combined subjective & objective (70:30) for all 6 subject. Six subjects and two groups consisting 600 marks. Subjects are given as follows:

MODULE 1

1. Advanced Accounting
2. Corporate and other Laws
3. Taxation

MODULE 2

1. Cost and Management Accounting
2. Auditing and Assurance
3. Strategic Management & Financial Management

Students are required to obtain 40% marks in each paper and 50% marks in aggregate of all the subjects. A student can appear in either one group or both the groups at a time.

== Exam date ==
Earlier, the CA Intermediate examinations were conducted twice a year, generally in the months of May and November. In 2024, the Institute of Chartered Accountants of India (ICAI) announced that, under its revised scheme, the Intermediate examinations will now be held three times a year — in January, May and September — with effect from 2025.

This change has been introduced to provide students with more flexibility and faster progression in the course, as part of ICAI’s updated education framework aligned with current professional and academic standards.

== Result date ==
Result for the CA Intermediate declares in the month of August and February i.e. two and half months after the exam.

== Exemption ==
The subject in which a student scores 60% or more marks will get exempted for the next three attempts. However, in order to claim the exemption, candidates must have appeared in all the papers of that Group/Unit.

== Commencement of articleship ==
A student becomes eligible to commence practical training after clearing both Groups of the CA Intermediate Examination and completing the four-week Integrated Course on Information Technology and Soft Skills (ICITSS), consisting of Information Technology Training (ITT) and Orientation Programme (OP). The duration of articleship under the revised scheme is two years and must be undertaken under the supervision of a practising Chartered Accountant.

== See also ==
- Education in India
- Institute of Chartered Accountants of India
- Chartered accountant
- Indian Chartered Accountancy Course
