= Auditing, Review and Other Standards =

Auditing, Review and Other Standards (formerly known as AAS) are the standards issued by Institute of Chartered Accountants of India.

Companies Act 2013 mandate the auditors to comply with auditing standards.
