= Amarjit Chopra =

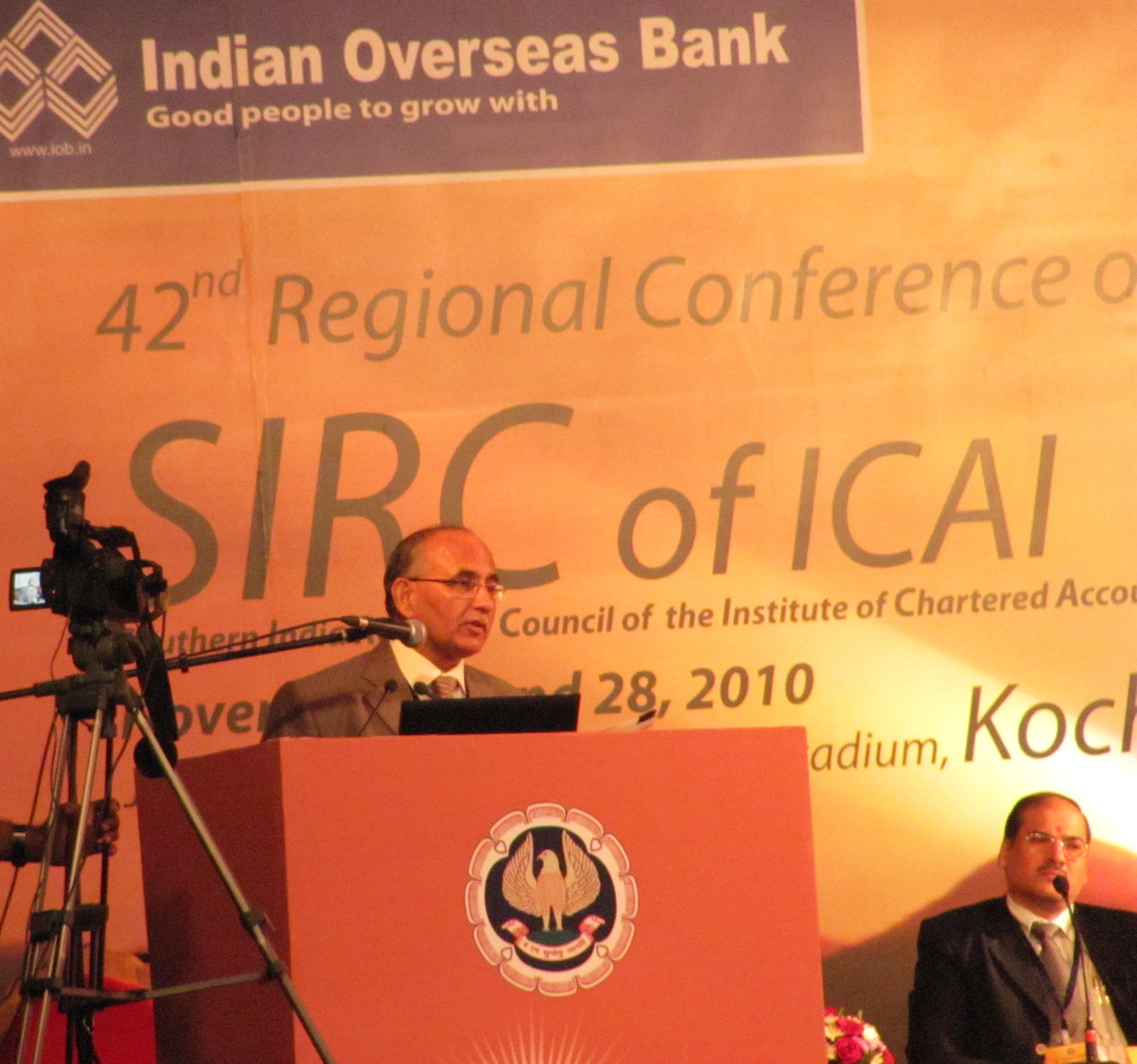

Institute of Chartered Accountants of India

President
- In office 2010–2011
- Preceded by: Uttam Prakash Agarwal
- Succeeded by: G. Ramaswamy

Personal details
- Born: India
- Occupation: Chartered Accountant

Amarjit Chopra is an Indian chartered accountant. He was the president of the Institute of Chartered Accountants of India (ICAI) during 2010–11 period.

He was also a member of the Professional Accountancy Organising Development Committee (PAODC) of IFAC from 2011–2014.

Chopra is also the current chairman of NACAS(National Advisory Committee on Accounting Standards).

Chopra holds a graduate and postgraduate degree from the University of Delhi. He completed a Ph.D. on the topic “NPA Management in Banks: A Comparison of Public and Private Sector Banks in India”.

Preceded by Uttam Prakash Agarwal	Chartered Accountant; 2009–2010	Succeeded by G. Ramaswamy
