= Post Graduate Government College, Sector 11, Chandigarh =

Post Graduate Government College Co-ed, Sector 11, (PGGC-11) is a constituent college of the Panjab University located in Sector 11, Chandigarh. It is as old as Chandigarh.

== History ==
The college was started on 26 May 1953 from a building in Sector 10, at present the building houses the famous Hotel Mountview. Later it was shifted to the premises of Government Model Senior Secondary School, Sector 23. Finally, on 13 October 1960, the college was moved to its own building in Sector 11. The college building was originally designed by E Maxwell Fry, an English modernist architect.

- Bachelor of Commerce
- Bachelor of Science
- Bachelor of Physical Education
- Bachelor of Computer Application
- Bachelor of Business Administration
- Masters in Physics
- Masters in Chemistry
- Masters in Zoology
- Masters in Botany

== Notable alumni ==
- Jimmy Sheirgill
- Sanjay Tandon
- Pawan Kumar Bansal
