= Chandigarh Lok Sabha constituency =

Lok Sabha Constituency in Chandigarh

Coordinates: 30.7°N 76.8°E

Chandigarh CH-1
- Lok Sabha constituency
- Interactive Map Outlining Chandigarh Lok Sabha constituency

Constituency details
- Country: India
- Union Territory: Chandigarh
- Established: 1967
- Total electors: 6,59,805 (2024)
- Reservation: None

Member of Parliament
- 18th Lok Sabha
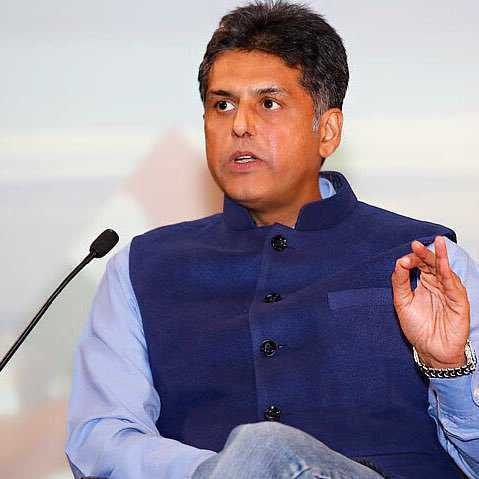
- Incumbent Manish Tewari
- Party: INC
- Alliance: INDIA
- Elected year: 2024

Chandigarh Lok Sabha constituency is a Lok Sabha parliamentary constituency and covers the entire Union Territory of Chandigarh.

Most successful parties from Chandigarh lok sabha
1. INC(8 times) (53.3%)
2. BJP(4 times) (26.7%)
3. BJS(1 time) (6.66%)
4. JP(1 time) (6.66%)
5. JD(1 time) (6.66%)

== Members of Parliament ==
The Chandigarh Lok Sabha constituency was created in 1968. The list of Member of Parliament (MP) is as follows:

Year	Member	Party
1967	Srichand Goyal	Bharatiya Jana Sangh
1971	Amarnath Vidyalanakar	Indian National Congress
1977	Krishan Kant	Janata Party
1980	Jagannath Kaushal	Indian National Congress (I)
1984	Jagannath Kaushal	Indian National Congress
1989	Harmohan Dhawan	Janata Dal
1991	Pawan Kumar Bansal	Indian National Congress
1996	Satya Pal Jain	Bharatiya Janata Party
1998	Satya Pal Jain	Bharatiya Janata Party
1999	Pawan Kumar Bansal	Indian National Congress
2004	Pawan Kumar Bansal	Indian National Congress
2009	Pawan Kumar Bansal	Indian National Congress
2014	Kirron Kher	Bharatiya Janata Party
2019	Kirron Kher	Bharatiya Janata Party
2024	Manish Tewari	Indian National Congress

== Election results ==
Vote share of Winning candidates
2024	48.22%
2019	50.64%
2014	42.20%
2009	46.87%
2004	52.06%
1999	47.00%
1998	42.36%
1996	39.05%
1991	35.86%
1989	42.05%
1984	66.02%
1980	49.65%
1977	66.13%
1971	66.85%
1967	48.70%

=== 2024 ===
2024 Indian general elections: Chandigarh
Party	Candidate	Votes	%	±%
INC	Manish Tewari	216,657	48.22	▲7.87
BJP	Sanjay Tandon	214,153	47.67	▼2.97
BSP	Ritu Singh	6,708	1.49	▼0.13
NOTA	None of the Above	2,912	0.65	▼0.30
Majority		2,504	0.55	▼9.74
Turnout		449,275	67.98	▼2.63
INC gain from BJP		Swing		

Detailed Results at: https://results.eci.gov.in/PcResultGenJune2024/ConstituencywiseU021.htm

=== 2019 ===
2019 Indian general elections: Chandigarh
Party	Candidate	Votes	%	±%
BJP	Kirron Anupam Kher	231,188	50.64	▲8.44
INC	Pawan Kumar Bansal	1,84,218	40.35	▲13.51
AAP	Harmohan Dhawan	13,781	3.82	▼20.15
BSP	Parveen Kumar	7,396	1.62	▼1.89
NOTA	None of the Above	4,335	0.95	▲0.27
Majority		46,970	10.29	▼5.07
Turnout		4,56,637	70.61	▼3.10
BJP hold		Swing		

=== 2014 ===
2014 Indian general elections: Chandigarh
Party	Candidate	Votes	%	±%
BJP	Kirron Anupam Kher	191,362	42.20	▲12.49
INC	Pawan Kumar Bansal	1,21,720	26.84	▼20.03
AAP	Gulkirat Kaur Panag	1,08,679	23.97	New
BSP	Jannat Jahan-Ul-Haq	15,934	3.51	▼14.37
Independent	Reena Sharma	2,643	0.58	N/A
NOTA	None of the Above	3,106	0.68	N/A
Majority		69,642	15.36	
Turnout		4,53,455	73.71	▲8.20
BJP gain from INC		Swing	▲16.26	

=== 2009 ===
2009 Indian general elections: Chandigarh
Party	Candidate	Votes	%	±%
INC	Pawan Kumar Bansal	161,042	46.87	▼5.19
BJP	Satya Pal Jain	1,02,075	29.71	▼5.51
BSP	Harmohan Dhawan	61,434	17.88	▲15.57
RJD	Haffiz Anwar-Ul-Haq	11,549	3.36	N/A
Independent	S. K. Suri	2,776	0.81	N/A
Majority		58,967	17.16	▲0.32
Turnout		3,43,557	65.51	▲14.61
INC hold		Swing	▼5.19	

=== 2004 ===
2004 Indian general elections: Chandigarh
Party	Candidate	Votes	%	±%
INC	Pawan Kumar Bansal	139,880	52.06	
BJP	Satya Pal Jain	94,632	35.22	
INLD	Harmohan Dhawan	17,762	6.61	
BSP	Hem Raj	6,203	2.31	
Majority		45,248	16.84	
Turnout		2,68,670	50.91	
INC hold		Swing		

=== 1999 ===
1999 Indian general election: Chandigarh
Party	Candidate	Votes	%	±%
INC	Pawan Kumar Bansal	132,924	47.00	
BJP	Krishan Lal Sharma	1,27,475	45.07	
BSP	Mata Ram Dhiman	7,781	2.75	
SP	Manphool Singh	4,853	1.72	
Ajeya Bharat Party	Dilbagh Singh	472	0.17	
BSP (A)	Bimla Sapna	411	0.15	
Independent	10 Independent Candidates	8,900	3.14	
Majority		5,449	1.93	
Turnout				
Swing to INC from BJP		Swing		

=== 1998 ===
1998 Indian general election: Chandigarh
Party	Candidate	Votes	%	±%
BJP	Satya Pal Jain	119,787	42.36	
INC	Pawan Kumar Bansal	1,09,421	38.70	
SJP(R)	Harmohan Dhawan	41,195	14.57	
SP	Amar Singh Chahal	4,552	1.61	
BSP (A)	Bimla	1,026	0.36	
Ajeya Bharat Party	Sunil Saini	959	0.34	
Lok Shakti	Ravi Parkash	608	0.22	
RJD	V. S. T. Malik	498	0.18	
AD	Shyam Bahadur Singh	283	0.10	
Independent	9 Independent Candidates	4,426	1.56	
Majority		10,366	3.66	
Turnout				
BJP hold		Swing		

=== 1996 ===
1996 Indian general election: Chandigarh
Party	Candidate	Votes	%	±%
BJP	Satya Pal Jain	101,137	39.05	
INC	Pawan Kumar Bansal	77,168	29.79	
SAP	Harmohan Dhawan	45,569	17.59	
BSP	Mata Ram Dhiman	10,612	4.10	
CPI(M)	Chaman Lal	6,030	2.33	
BSP (A)	Subhash Tamoli	4,128	1.59	
JD	Ravi Parkash	2,405	0.93	
JP	Ajay Jagga	834	0.32	
IC(S)	Mahinder Kumar	654	0.25	
AIIC(T)	Vishwavir Sharma	513	0.20	
SS	Sudhir Kumar	195	0.08	
Others	2 Other Parties	1,617	0.62	N/A
Independent	35 Independent Candidates	8,145	3.16	
Majority		23,969	9.26	
Turnout				
Swing to BJP from INC		Swing		

=== 1991 ===
1991 Indian general election: Chandigarh
Party	Candidate	Votes	%	±%
INC	Pawan Kumar Bansal	76,628	35.86	
BJP	Satya Pal Jain	61,533	28.80	
JP	Harmohan Dhawan	50,177	23.48	
BSP	Harbhajan Singh Osahan	10,068	4.71	
JD	P. J. S. Mehta	5,905	2.76	
Others	4 Other Parties	546	0.25	N/A
Independent	46 Independent Candidates	8,805	4.13	
Majority		15,095	7.06	
Turnout				
Swing to INC from JD		Swing		

=== 1989 ===
1989 Indian general election: Chandigarh
Party	Candidate	Votes	%	±%
JD	Harmohan Dhawan	91,212	42.05	
INC	Jagan Nath Kaushal	87,238	40.22	
BJP	Dharam Vir Sehgal	26,586	12.26	
BSP	Uajagar Singh Sandhu	2,905	1.34	
JP	Aftab Rai Maini	1,336	0.62	
Others	3 Other Parties	565	0.26	N/A
Independent	19 Independent Candidates	7,061	3.27	
Majority		3,974	1.83	
Turnout				
Swing to JD from INC		Swing		

=== 1984 ===
1984 Indian general election: Chandigarh
Party	Candidate	Votes	%	±%
INC	Jagan Nath Kaushal	103,090	66.02	
JP	Harmohan Dhawan	36,790	23.56	
BJP	Yagya Datt Sharma	8,740	5.60	
Independent	30 Independent Candidates	7,523	4.83	
Majority		66,300	42.46	
Turnout				
Swing to INC(I) from INC		Swing		

=== 1980 ===
1980 Indian general election: Chandigarh
Party	Candidate	Votes	%	±%
INC(I)	Jagan Nath Kaushal	61,624	49.65	
Independent	Ram Swrup	28,305	22.81	
JP	Krishna Kant	11,541	9.30	
INC(U)	Ambika Soni	8,965	7.22	
Independent	Sukhdev Khanna	6,021	4.85	
JP(S)	M. P. Verma	1,005	0.81	
Independent	33 Independent Candidates	6,654	5.35	
Majority		33,319	26.84	
Turnout				
Swing to INC(I) from JP		Swing		

=== 1977 ===
1977 Indian general election: Chandigarh
Party	Candidate	Votes	%	±%
JP	Krishna Kant	70,808	66.13	
INC	Sat Pal	30,382	28.37	
CPI	Sheila Didi	2,481	2.32	
Independent	7 Independent Candidates	3,410	3.18	
Majority		40,426	37.76	
Turnout				
Swing to JP from INC		Swing		

=== 1971 ===
1971 Indian general election: Chandigarh
Party	Candidate	Votes	%	±%
INC	Amar Nath Vidyalankar	48,335	66.85	
ABJS	Shri Chand Goyal	16,854	23.31	
Independent	Kanti Prakash	4,697	6.50	
VHP	Baldev Raj Kapoor	153	0.21	
Independent	7 Independent Candidates	2,263	3.13	
Majority		31,481	43.54	
Turnout				
Swing to INC from ABJS		Swing		

=== 1967 ===
1967 Indian general election: Chandigarh
Party	Candidate	Votes	%	±%
ABJS	C. Goyal	23,939	48.70	
INC	A. Nath	11,323	23.04	
SWA	H. Singh	10,258	20.87	
CPI(M)	K. R. Palta	1,580	3.21	
Independent	6 Independent Candidates	2,055	4.18	
Majority		12,616	25.66	
Turnout				
ABJS win (new seat)				
