= Madan Mohan Punchhi =

28th Chief Justice of India

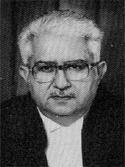

28th Chief Justice of India
- In office 18 January 1998 – 9 October 1998
- Appointed by: K. R. Narayanan
- Preceded by: J. S. Verma
- Succeeded by: Adarsh Sein Anand

Personal details
- Born: 10 October 1933 Pakpattan, Punjab, British India
- Died: 17 June 2015 (aged 81)
- Education: Faculty of Law, University of Delhi

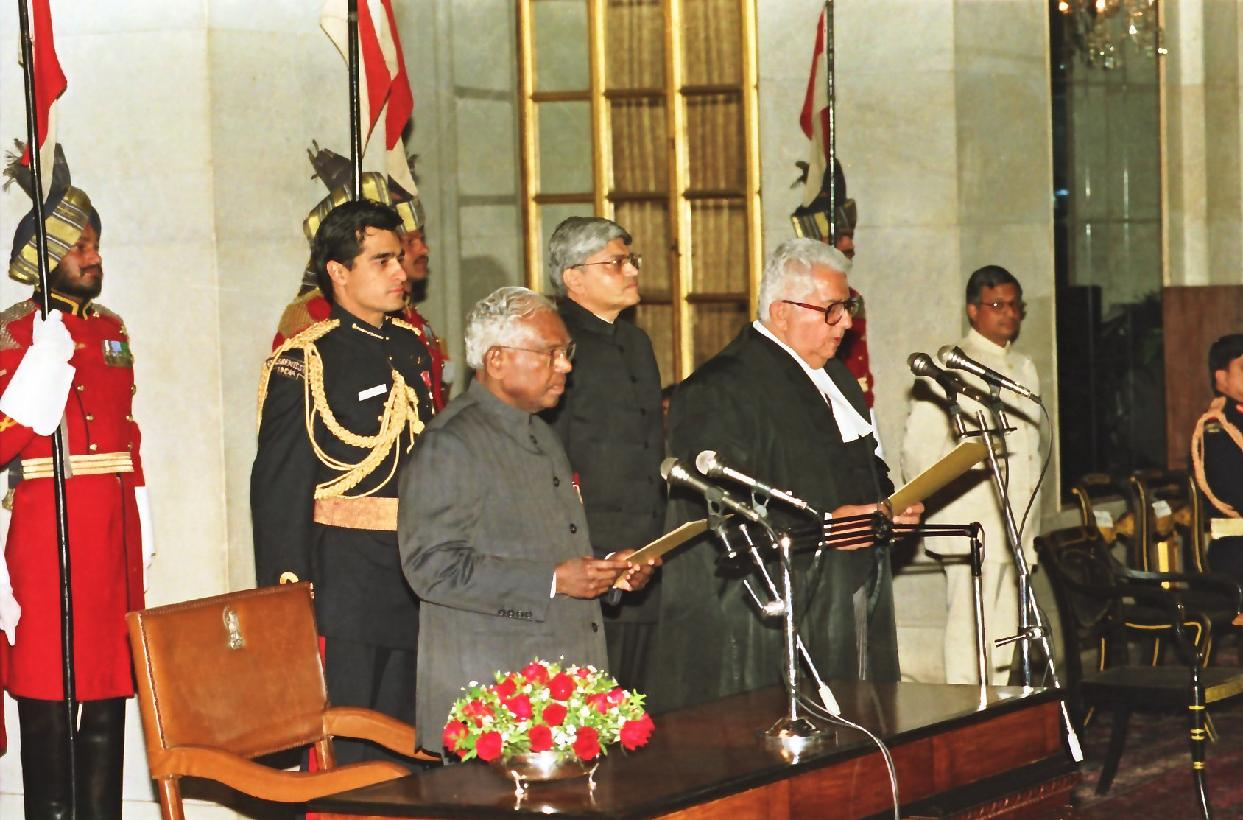
The President of India, Shri K R Narayanan at the Swearing-in-Ceremony of the Chief Justice of India, Shri Madan Mohan Punchhi at the Ashok Hall of Rashtrapati Bhavan in New Delhi on Jan 18, 1998

Madan Mohan Punchhi (10 October 1933 – 17 June 2015) was the 28th Chief Justice of India from 18 January 1998 until his retirement on 9 October 1998.

== Early life and education ==
His father, Nand Lal Punchhi was a lawyer. He graduated from the DAV College and Faculty of Law, University of Delhi.

== Career ==
He began his legal career at his father's chambers in 1955, and was appointed as a judge of the Punjab and Haryana High Court in October 1979.

In October 1989, he was appointed as judge of the Supreme Court of India, and became Chief Justice of India in January 1998. Over the course of his Supreme Court tenure, Punchhi authored 142 judgments and sat on 776 benches.

Post retirement, he was appointed by the Government of India as the Chairman of the Centre State relations commission, subsequently known as the Punchhi commission, which dealt with matters pertaining to the Centre-State relations in India.

He was a resident of Chandigarh.

== Personal life ==
He was married to Meera Punchhi, and had two sons and two daughters. His daughter Priya is married to BJP politician Sanjay Tandon.

Legal offices
Preceded by Jagdish Sharan Verma	Chief Justice of India; 18 January 1998– 9 October 1998	Succeeded by Adarsh Sein Anand
