= Common Proficiency Test =

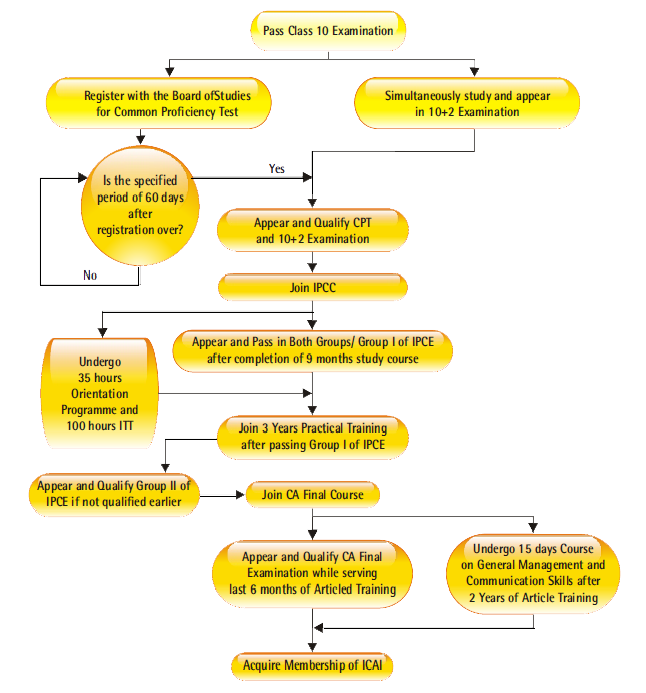
Flowchart on how to become a Chartered Accountant by the Examination route

The CPT or Common Proficiency Test was the first level of Chartered Accountancy examinations in India which has been changed to CA Foundation according to ICAI's revised scheme.

== Eligibility ==
A person can register for CPT after completing Grade 10 and take the exam after completing High School (Grade 12) and complete graduation for commerce

== Test model ==
It is an objective type examination and consists of 200 multiple choice questions. CPT covers four basic subjects divided into two sections viz.

1.Accounting (60 Marks) + Mercantile Laws (40 Marks)

2.Economics (50 Marks) + Quantitative Aptitude (50 Marks)

Every incorrect answer on the CPT exam carries a 0.25 negative mark. A candidate is required to secure a minimum of 30 per cent marks in each Section and a minimum of 50 per cent marks in aggregate, in all the four Sections to pass the Common Proficiency Test.

== Exam dates ==
CPT exams are held in June and December

== Result Dates ==
CPT Result is declared in the month of July and January. June exam's result is declared during 12–20 July and December exam's result is declared during 12–20 January.

== Exemption ==
But with effect from 3 August 2012, CPT is exempted for the Graduates, Post Graduates and the students having equivalent degrees. Commerce graduates with 55% and other graduates with 60% can take direct admission for IPCC.

== See also ==
- Education in India
- Institute_of_Chartered_Accountants_of_India
- Chartered accountant
- Chartered accountant
- Indian Chartered Accountancy Course
