= Chartered Accountants Act, 1949 =

Indian law establishing the Institute of Chartered Accountants

Constituent Assembly of India
- Long title: An Act to make provision for the regulation of the profession of Chartered Accountants.
- Citation: Act No. 38 of 1949
- Territorial extent: Whole of India
- Enacted by: Constituent Assembly of India
- Enacted: 1 May 1949
- Assented to: 1 May 1949
- Commenced: 1 July 1949
- Status: In force

The Chartered Accountants Act, 1949 is a statute enacted by the Constituent Assembly of India, which was acting as the provisional Parliament of India in 1949, to regulate the profession of Chartered Accountants in India. Under this act, The Institute of Chartered Accountants of India was established as a statutory body for the promotion, development and regulation of "the profession of Chartered Accountants in India". The law provides for qualifications, elections for central as well as regional councils, penalties for misconduct by Chartered Accountants.
