= Tapasya College of Commerce and Management =

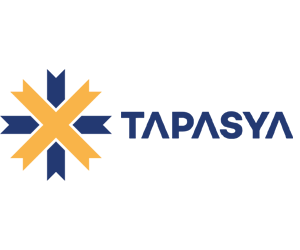
- Type: Private
- Established: 2009
- Affiliations: Osmania University, Telangana State Board of Intermediate Education, Karnataka Pre-University Board, Bangalore University
- Chairman: CA Muppala Sreedhar
- Dean: Oguri Srihari Rao
- Director: K Srinivas Rao
- Academic staff: 800
- Administrative staff: 120
- Students: 18472
- Location: Hyderabad, Telangana, India
- Campus: Urban
- Website: https://www.tapasyaedu.com/

Tapasya College of Commerce and Management (TCCM) is an educational institute based in Hyderabad, Telangana, India. The college is affiliated with Osmania University and approved by Government of Telangana and Telangana State Board of Intermediate Education.

== History ==
Tapasya College of Commerce and Management (TCCM) was established in 2009 under the Osmania University and Telangana State Board of Intermediate Education based in Hyderabad, Telangana.
