= CA Foundation Course =

Indian accountancy course

The CA Foundation Course is the entrance level for the chartered accountancy course offered by the Institute of Chartered Accountants of India (ICAI). Earlier, it was known as the Common Proficiency Test. CA Foundation contains 5 series of papers. The CA Foundation exam replaced the CA-CPT exam and now is conducted by the Institute of Chartered Accountants of India (ICAI) thrice a year. After the CA Foundation exam, students need to complete the Intermediate and Final levels as well to become a chartered accountant

== Eligibility ==
The candidate can register for CA Foundation after passing the secondary school examinations (Class-X) and appear in the foundation exam after qualifying for the 12th examinations. ICAI has allowed provisional registration for 10th class passed students.Eligibility Criteria for CA Foundation Course 1. Educational Qualification: • Class 10: Students who have passed the Class 10 examination conducted by an examining body constituted by law in India or an examination recognized by the Central Government or the State Government as equivalent can register for the CA Foundation course on a provisional basis.

• Class 12: To appear for the CA Foundation exam, students must have passed the Class 12 examination from a recognized board. Provisional registration is allowed after Class 10, but students must clear their Class 12 exams to be eligible to sit for the Foundation exam.

1. Registration with ICAI:

• Students must register with the Institute of Chartered Accountants of India (ICAI) for the CA Foundation course. The registration should be completed at least four months before the first day of the month in which the exam is held. For example, to appear in the May/June exam, students should register by January 1st, and for the November/December exam, by July 1st.

2. Study Period:

• A minimum study period of four months is required before appearing for the CA Foundation exam. This period allows students to prepare adequately for the examination.

3. Age Limit:

• There is no age limit for registering for the CA Foundation course. Students of any age who meet the educational qualifications can apply.

4. Exemptions:

• Certain categories of students may be exempt from appearing for the CA Foundation exam. For example, graduates or postgraduates in commerce with a minimum of 55% marks or graduates in other streams with a minimum of 60% marks can directly register for the CA Intermediate course register for the ca intermediate course, bypassing the Foundation level.

== Test model ==
CA Foundation is a partially subjective and partially objective examination consisting of four papers:

Paper 1: Accounting

Paper 2: Business Laws

Paper 3: Quantitative Aptitude (Business Mathematics, Logical Reasoning, and Statistics)

Paper 4: Business Economics

Papers 1 and 2 are subjective, while Papers 3 and 4 are objective. Each paper carries 100 marks, making the total 400 marks. Paper 3 and 4 carries negative marking, deducting -0.25 marks for each incorrect option while awarding +1 for correct.

ICAI New Course - Prospectus.

Recent passing rates have decreased significantly since ICAI introduced New Course. Typical passing rates hover around 15-20% with the lowest ever of 14.78%.

== Registration ==
A candidate has to register for CA Foundation Course by filling up the online registration form available on the ICAI website. The last date for registration is March/July for the May/September terms of examination. Registration for the CA Foundation course is valid only for four years.

== Date of the exams ==
The CA Foundation examinations are primarily conducted thrice a year, generally in the months of January, May and September. The Council of ICAI retains the authority to schedule these examinations at additional intervals if required. Students must submit their online examination application form in November for the January session, in March for May session and in July for the September session.

== Exemption ==
Graduates, post-graduates and students with equivalent degrees are exempt from the course requirement. Commerce graduates with 55% and other graduates with 60% marks can take direct admission for the CA Intermediate

== See also ==
- Education in India
