= Harmohan Dhawan =

Indian politician (1940–2024)

MP
- In office 1989–1991
- Preceded by: Arif Mohammad Khan
- Succeeded by: Madhavrao Scindia
- Constituency: Chandigarh

Personal details
- Born: 14 July 1940 Fatehjung, Punjab Province, British India
- Died: 27 January 2024 (aged 83) Mohali, Punjab, India
- Spouse: Satinder Dhawan
- Children: 2 sons and 1 daughter

Harmohan Dhawan (14 July 1940 – 27 January 2024) was an Indian politician who was Member of Parliament from Chandigarh.

== Life and career ==
Harmohan Dhawan was born on 14 July 1940 at Fatehjung, District Caimbalpur (now in Pakistan). After the Partition of India in 1947, his family migrated to Ambala Cantonment where he did his Matriculation from B.D. High School, and Intermediate from S.D. College.

In 1960, Dhawan joined the Department of Botany at Panjab University, Chandigarh, and did his B.Sc. (Honours) in 1963 and MSc (Honours) in the year 1965. He was a research scholar from 1965 to 1970 and joined the PL 480 aided project, wherein he did research on "Cytological Studies of the Economic Plants of North West Himalayas". In 1970 he started a Small Scale Unit and became president of the Industries Association of Chandigarh. In 1979, he opened Mehfil, a fine-dining restaurant.

Dhawan received the best Young Entrepreneur Award from the Vice President of India in 1983.

In 1977 he entered politics, and was mentored by the late prime minister Chandra Shekhar. He became president of the Janata Party in 1981. Because of his Socialist philosophies, he worked for the welfare of the downtrodden and went to jail more than 10 times for their cause.

In 1989 he was elected as Member of Parliament from the Chandigarh constituency and became Minister of Civil Aviation, in the late Mr. Chandra Shekhar's Government.

Dhawan was a senior leader of the Bharatiya Janata Party (BJP) which is now the single most dominant party of the Indian parliament after the 2014 general election. Dhawan later joined the Aam Aadmi Party after being impressed by the performance of the Arvind Kejriwal-led Govt of Delhi.

Dhawan died on 27 January 2024, at the age of 83.
