= National Advisory Committee on Accounting Standards =

National Advisory Committee on Accounting Standards (NACAS) is a body set up under section 210A of the Companies Act, 1956 by the Government of India. It advises the Central Government on the formulation and laying down of accounting policy and accounting standards for adoption by companies . The advisory committee shall consist of the following members, namely: 1. A chairperson who shall be a person of eminence well versed in accountancy, finance, business administration, business law, economics or similar Discipline; 2. One member each nominated by The Institute of Chartered Accountants of India constituted under the Chartered Accountants Act, 1949, The Institute of Cost and Work Accountants Act, 1959 and The Institute of Company Secretaries of India constituted under the Company secretaries Act 1980. 3. One representative each of the Central government, Reserve Bank of India, Comptroller & Auditor General of India to be nominated by it. 4. A person who holds or has held the office of professor in Accountancy, Finance or Business Management in any University or deemed university; 5. The Chairman of the Central Board of Direct Tax (India) constituted under the Central Board of Revenue Act, 1963 (India) or his nominee; 6. Two members to represent the chambers of commerce and industry to be nominated by The Central Government of India; and 7. One representative of the Security and Exchange Board of India to be nominated by it.

Further, Institute of Chartered Accountants of India (ICAI) has the responsibility of preparing the accounting standards and recommend them to NACAS

CA.Amarjit Chopra is the current chairman of NACAS. He is a past president of Institute of Chartered Accountants of India, (ICAI). CA. M M Chitale and CA Y H Malegam have been Chairmen of NACAS in the past.
