= Satya Pal Jain =

Indian politician (born 1952)

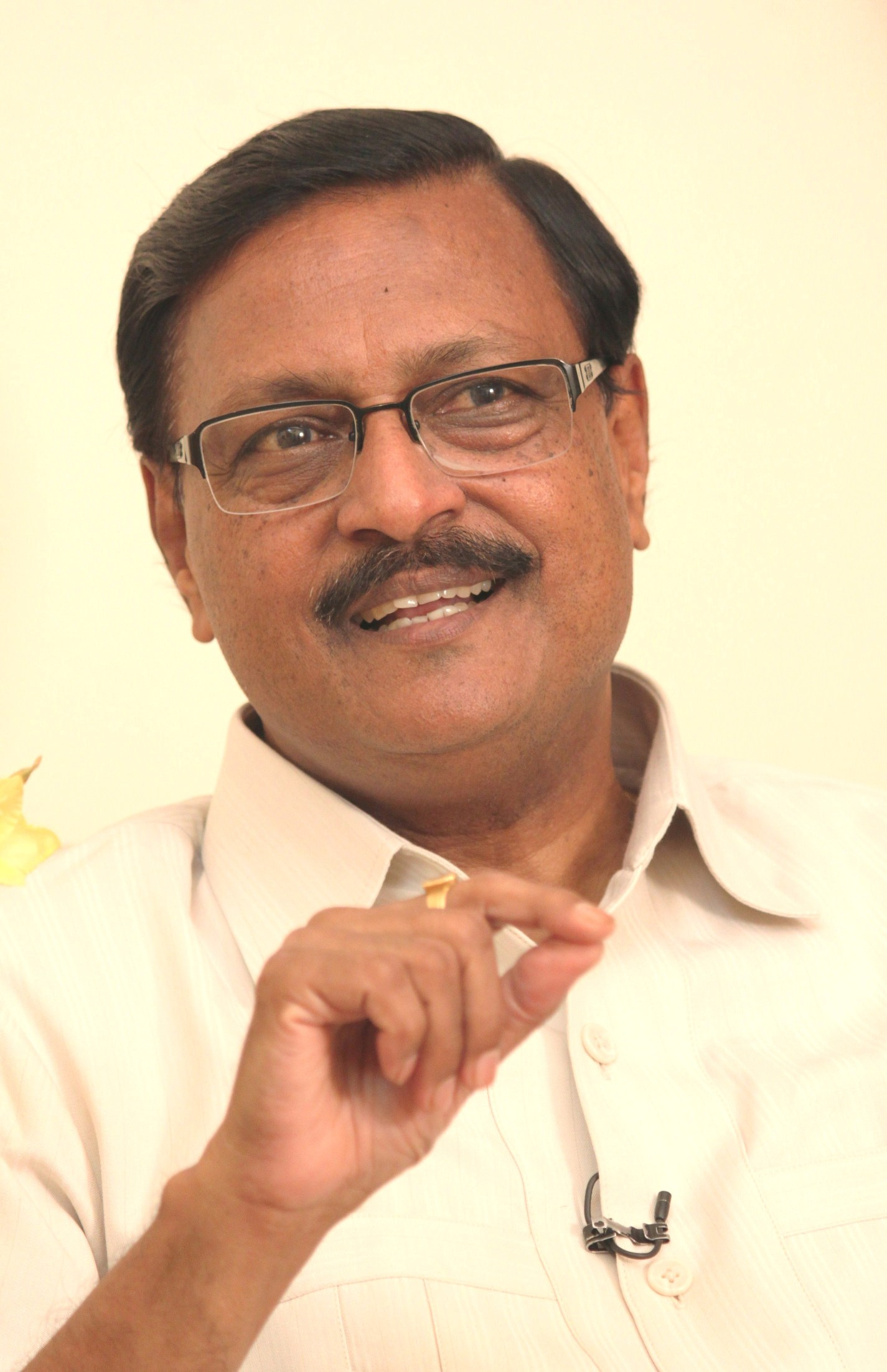
- Satya Pal Jain

Additional Solicitor General of India
- Incumbent
- Assumed office 8 April 2015

Part-time Member, Law Commission of India
- In office 10 June 2016 – 31 August 2018

Member, National Executive Committee, BJP
- Incumbent
- Assumed office 2000

Chairman, National Committee for Legal Affairs & Election Commission Issues, BJP
- In office 19 July 2013 – 2015

Chairman, National Legal Working Group, BJP
- In office 20 May 2013 – 2015

All India Incharge, Legal & Legislative Cell, BJP
- In office 2003–2007

Incharge (Prabhari), BJP Himachal Pradesh
- In office 2007–2010

Member of Parliament, Lok Sabha
- In office 10 May 1996 – 26 April 1999
- Constituency: Chandigarh

Personal details
- Born: 15 June 1952 (age 73) Kharar, Punjab, India
- Party: BJP
- Spouse: Shashi Bala Jain
- Children: Dheeraj Jain
- Profession: Senior Advocate
- Website: Website

Satya Pal Jain is an Additional Solicitor General of India. He is a Member of Bharatiya Janata Party (BJP) National Executive Committee. He was elected Member of Parliament from Chandigarh in 1996 (11th Lok Sabha) and 1998 (12th Lok Sabha). He is a practising Senior Advocate in the Supreme Court of India and the Punjab and Haryana High Court at Chandigarh.

== Early life and career ==
Born at Kharar (District Ropar, Punjab) on 15 June 1952, he did his schooling from Christian High School, Kharar. He passed his BA (with honours in Political Science) in 1973 from Government College of Education, Chandigarh, and MA (Political Science) from Panjab University, Chandigarh in 1975. He started his career as a newspaper hawker. He, with his father Rup Lal Jain, used to sell newspapers at Kharar. He pursued his education under hard circumstances. By his hard work he has risen from a hawker to a leading senior advocate and a sharp Parliamentarian.

Because of Emergency in 1975 he had to go to DAV College, Dehradun (affiliated to Hemwati Nandan Bahuguna Garhwal University, Srinagar) to join law from where he obtained his Law Degree in 1979.

He was active in public life from his school days, when he was President of the Students Union of Christian High School, Kharar, a member of the Central Council of the Government College, Chandigarh and was elected as General Secretary of the Punjab University Students' Council in 1974.

He took active part in the movement led by Jai Prakash Narayan in 1974–76. Immediately, after the declaration of Emergency, he was arrested under DIR in July 1975, at the young age of 23. On the call given by Narayan, he participated in the 'Satyagraha' against the Emergency and offered arrest in Chandigarh on 27 January 1976. During Police Custody, he was tortured by Chandigarh Police by giving him electric shocks.

He was elected to the Panjab University Senate in 1976, at the young age of 24 years, and again in 1980, 1984 and 1988 from Graduates Constituency. He was nominated as a Member of the PU Senate by the Vice-President of India in 1996, 2000, 2004 and 2008.

He has been an active member of the Akhil Bhartiya Vidyarthi Parishad (ABVP). He has been the All-India Secretary of ABVP, President of its Chandigarh Unit and a Member of its National Executive for about 10 years.

He has been associated with the Rashtriya Swayamsevak Sangh (RSS) for the last about 30 years and is a second year OTC trained Swayam Sewak of the Sangh.

== Parliamentary career ==
He contested elections to the Lok Sabha from Chandigarh Parliamentary Constituency as a candidate of the Bharatiya Janata Party (BJP) in the General Elections held in the years 1991, 1996, 1998, 2004, and 2009. He was elected to the Lok Sabha in 1996 (11th Lok Sabha) and 1998 (12th Lok Sabha).

During his membership of the 11th Lok Sabha (1996–1998), he was appointed the Whip of the Bhartiya Janta Party for all the states of Northern India, in incharge of Punjab Affairs in Lok Sabha, and was also appointed as Convener of Legal Committee of the BJP Parliamentary Party. He also remained a member of the Consultative and Parliamentary Standing Committees of Ministry of Home Affairs and The Privileges Committee of Lok Sabha. He was also elected to the Institute Body of Post Graduate Institute of Medical Education and Research, Chandigarh, by the Lok Sabha.

During his 2nd term as a member of Lok Sabha (1998–1999), he was again nominated as a member of the Parliamentary Standing Committee on Home Affairs, the Home Ministry's Consultative Committee of Parliament, Estimates Committee of Lok Sabha and the Business Advisory Committee. He was also re-elected by the Lok Sabha as a member of the Institute Body of PGIMER, Chandigarh. He was also taken as a member of the Select Committee of Parliament on the Essential Commodities Amendment Bill in 1998. During his second term also, he was made Whip of the BJP for North India in Lok Sabha.

He was invited as a member of the Indian delegation of MPs to visit Pakistan by the Jang Group of Newspapers. He visited Lahore and Islamabad in Pakistan as a member of 25 MP delegation in February 1999, a few days before the historic visit of Prime Minister of India, Atal Bihari Vajpayee, to Pakistan by bus, on 19 February 1999.

During his membership of 11th and 12th Lok Sabha, he took a keen interest in the affairs of Parliament and actively participated in its debates.

In July 2002, he was nominated as a member of the National Executive Committee of the BJP and made the 'Prabhari' (in Incharge) of the party's state unit of Uttaranchal (now Uttarakhand). In January 2003, he was nominated as the Incharge of Legal Cell and Election Cell of the BJP.

In August 2004, he was nominated as the All India Convener of Legal Cell of BJP and was re-nominated as a member of the National Executive Committee of the BJP. In 2006, he was again nominated as a member of the National Executive Committee of the BJP for the third time, consecutively.

From May 2007 – June 2010, he was made the Incharge (Prabhari) of Himachal Pradesh unit of the BJP. During his tenure, the BJP formed the government in Himachal Pradesh in December 2007, by winning 41 out of 68 seats in the Assembly.

He was elected as the Dean of the Faculty of Law, Panjab University Chandigarh in December 2007.

He was appointed as the election agent of Bhairon Singh Shekhawat and Najma Heptullah, the NDA's candidates for the election to the office of the President of India and the Vice President of India, in July 2007.

In June 2010, he was nominated as the All India in Incharge of the Legal & Legislative Cell of BJP.

In February 2011, he was nominated as a Member of the eight-member high-powered BJP Election Reforms Committee formed by Nitin Gadkari, All India President of BJP to comprehensively study the election-related issues, such as the effect of black money in the elections, criminalization of politics, the efficacy of EVMs and reservation for women in Parliament and State Legislatures.

In July 2012, he was appointed as the Authorised Representative of P. A. Sangma, the NDA's candidate for the election to the office of the President of India.

In December 2012, he was elected to the Panjab University Syndicate, the highest decision-making body of the University.

In March 2013, he was re-nominated as a member of the National Executive Committee of the BJP for the 5th consecutive term by Rajnath Singh, National President, BJP.

In May 2013, he was nominated as the Chairman of the six-member National Legal Working Group of the BJP formed by Rajnath Singh, National President, BJP to study comprehensively important legal issues and help the party to effectively formulate its stand on all legal subjects.

In March 2015, he was re-nominated as a member of the National Executive Committee of the BJP for the 7th consecutive term by Amit Shah, National President, BJP.

== Additional Solicitor General ==
On 9 April 2015 he was appointed as the Additional Solicitor General of India in the Punjab and Haryana High Court at Chandigarh by Pranab Mukherjee, President of India. This post was created for this High Court in December 2014 by the Government of India and he is the first appointee to this post.

On 10 June 2016, he was appointed as a part-time member of the 21st Law Commission of India. Dr. Justice B.S. Chauhan, former Supreme Court Judge, is the Chairman of this Commission. It has been constituted by the Central Government led by Prime Minister of India, Narendra Modi, to study judicial reforms in the country, various legal issues as well as the laws which have become redundant and to make its comprehensive recommendations to the Government of India. The tenure of the 21st Law Commission of India ended on 31 August 2018.
