= Institute of Chartered Accountants of India =

National professional accounting body in India

The Institute of Chartered Accountants of India
- Emblem of ICAI
- Abbreviation: ICAI
- Formation: 1 July 1949; 77 years ago
- Legal status: Established under the Chartered Accountants Act, 1949 enacted by the Parliament of India
- Purpose: Accounting and Auditing Regulatory Body
- Headquarters: ICAI Bhawan, Post Box No. 7100, Indraprastha Marg, New Delhi 110002, India
- Coordinates: 28.627815°N 77.242135°E
- Region served: India
- Members: 4,00,000+(2024)
- Official language: English, Hindi
- President: CA. Prasanna Kumar D.
- Vice President: CA. Mangesh P. Kinare
- Secretary: CA. (Dr.) Jai Kumar Batra
- Parent organization: Ministry of Corporate Affairs, Government of India
- Website: www.icai.org

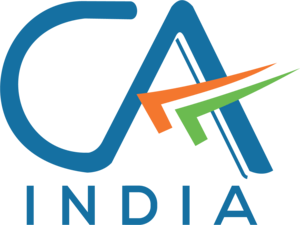
New Logo of CA India

The Institute of Chartered Accountants of India, abbreviated as ICAI, is India's largest professional accounting body under the administrative control of Ministry of Corporate Affairs, Government of India. It was established on 1 July 1949 as a statutory body under the Chartered Accountants Act, 1949 enacted by the Parliament for promotion, development and regulation of the profession of Chartered Accountancy in India.

"The Institute of Chartered Accountants (ICAI) of India plays a significant role in maintaining accounting, auditing, and ethical standards in India, contributing to the stability and transparency of the country’s financial system.”

Members of the institute are known as ICAI Chartered Accountants or Indian CAs (either Fellow member - FCA, or Associate member - ACA). However, the word chartered does not refer to or flow from any Royal Charter. ICAI Chartered Accountants are subject to a published Code of Ethics and professional standards, violation of which is subject to disciplinary action. Only a member of ICAI with valid certificate of practice can be appointed as statutory auditor of a company under the Companies Act, 2013 and tax auditor under Income-tax Act, 1961. The management of the institute is vested with its council with the president acting as its chief executive authority. A person can become a member of ICAI and become a financial (i.e. statutory) auditor of Indian Companies. The professional membership organization is known for its non-profit service. ICAI has entered into mutual recognition agreements with other professional accounting bodies worldwide for reciprocal membership recognition. ICAI is one of the founder members of the International Federation of Accountants (IFAC), South Asian Federation of Accountants (SAFA), and Confederation of Asian and Pacific Accountants (CAPA). ICAI was formerly the provisional jurisdiction for XBRL International in India. In 2010, it promoted eXtensible Business Reporting Language (XBRL) India as a section 8 Company to take over this responsibility from it. Now, eXtensible Business Reporting Language (XBRL) India is an established jurisdiction of XBRL International Inc.

The Institute of Chartered Accountants of India was established under the Chartered Accountants Act, 1949 passed by the Parliament of India with the objective of regulating the accountancy profession in India. ICAI is the second largest professional accounting body in the world in terms of number of membership and number of students after the AICPA. It prescribes the qualifications for a Chartered Accountant, conducts the requisite examinations and grants Certificate of Practice. In India, accounting standards and auditing standards are recommended by the National Financial Reporting Authority (NFRA) since its foundation in 2018 ( previously it was ICAI's role) to the Government of India which sets the Standards on Auditing (SAs) to be followed in the audit of financial statements in India.

== History ==
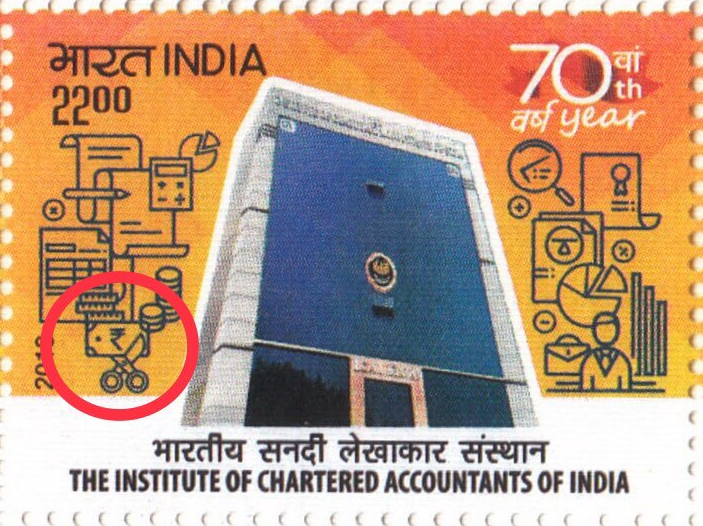
A 2018 stamp dedicated to the 70th anniversary of the Institute of Chartered Accountants of India

Government Diploma in Accountancy Certificate

The Indian Companies Act, 1913 passed in pre-independent India prescribed various books which had to be maintained by a Company registered under that Act. It also required the appointment of a formal Auditor with prescribed qualifications to audit such records. In order to act as an auditor, a person had to acquire a restricted certificate from the local government upon such conditions as may be prescribed. The holder of a restricted certificate was allowed to practice only within the province of an issue and in the language specified in the restricted certificate. In 1918 a course called Government Diploma in Accountancy was launched in Sydenham College of Commerce and Economics of Bombay (now known as Mumbai). On passing this diploma and completion of three years of articled training under an approved accountant, a person was held eligible for grant of an unrestricted certificate. This certificate entitling the holder to practice as an auditor throughout India. Later on, the issue of restricted certificates was discontinued in the year 1920.

In 1930, it was decided that the Government of India should maintain a register called the Register of Accountants. Any person whose name was entered in such register was called a Registered Accountant. Later on a board called the Indian Accountancy Board was established to advise the Governor General of India on accountancy and the qualifications for auditors. However, it was felt that the accountancy profession was largely unregulated, and this caused much confusion as regards the qualifications of auditors. Hence in the year 1948, just after independence in 1947, an expert committee was created to look into the matter. This expert committee recommended that a separate autonomous association of accountants should be formed to regulate the profession. The Government of India accepted the recommendation and passed the Chartered Accountants Act in 1949 even before India became a republic. Under section 3 of the said Act, ICAI is established as a body corporate with perpetual succession and a common seal.

Unlike most other commonwealth countries, the word chartered does not refer to a royal charter, since India is a republic. At the time of passing the Chartered Accountants Act, various titles used for similar professionals in other countries were considered, such as Certified Public Accountant. This designation inherited a general public impression that Chartered Accountants had better qualifications than Registered Accountants. Hence the accountants were very stern in their stand that, the Indian accountancy professionals should be designated only as Chartered Accountants. After much debate in the Indian Constituent Assembly, the controversial term, chartered was accepted. When the Chartered Accountants Act, 1949 came into force on 1 July 1949, the term Chartered Accountant superseded the title of Registered Accountant. This day is celebrated as Chartered Accountants Day every year.

On 23 September 2019 chartered accountancy students organized protests under leadership of teacher CA Praveen Sharma, named "Dear ICAI please change" at over 200 institute branches across India and on social media demanding among other things right to re-checking of CA exam answer sheets. At present as per CA regulations, re-checking of answer sheets are not allowed. Students were demanding this right since 2018. A protest was also called in December, 2018 but after assurance by the council and formation of a committee to review the examination process the protest was called off. Students were able to gather support of many public figures which includes Congress leader Rahul Gandhi, Past President of ICAI Mr. N. D. Gupta, renowned accountant Mr. Motilal Oswal, Mr. Mohandas Pai, Mr. Raghav Chadha, etc. on social media.

== Motto ==
The motto of the ICAI is Ya Aeshu Suptaeshu Jagruti (Sanskrit), which literally means "a person who is awake in those that sleep". It is a quotation from the Katha Upanishad. It was given to the ICAI at the time of its formation in 1949 by Sri Aurobindo as a part of its emblem. CA. C. S. Shastri, a Chartered Accountant from Chennai went to Sri Aurobindo and requested him through a letter to give an emblem to the newly formed Institute of which he was an elected member from the Southern India. In reply to this request, Sri Aurobindo gave him the emblem with a Garuda, the mythical eagle in the center and a quotation from the Upanishad: Ya Aeshu Suptaeshu Jagruti. The emblem along with the motto was placed at the first meeting of the Council of the Institute and was accepted amongst many other emblems placed by other members of the council.

Apart from its emblem, ICAI also has a separate logo for its members. As a part of a brand building exercise, ICAI introduced this separate new CA logo for the use of its members in 2007. The logo is free for use by all members of ICAI subject to certain conditions. The logo was launched by the then Minister of Corporate Affairs, Prem Chand Gupta at the occasion of the Chartered Accountant Day (1 July) in the presence of the then President of ICAI Sunil Talati. Members of ICAI cannot use the ICAI emblem, but they are encouraged to use the CA logo instead on their official stationery.

ICAI is a founder member of the International Federation of Accountants (IFAC), South Asian Federation of Accountants (SAFA), and Confederation of Asian and Pacific Accountants (CAPA) and International Innovation Network (IIN). ICAI is an Associate member of the Chartered Accountants Worldwide, and a member of International Valuation Standards Council (IVSC).

Through its Global Trade & Services Committee, ICAI has expanded its international footprint, establishing a presence across 85 global cities in 47 countries to enhance professional opportunities and global mobility for Indian CAs.

== Membership ==
Members of the Institute are known as Chartered Accountants. Becoming a member requires passing the prescribed examinations, 24 months of practical training and meeting other requirements under the Act and Regulations. The institute has 4,00,000 members currently.

=== Associates and fellows ===
Generally, associates are members of the institute with less than five years of membership after which they become eligible to apply for fellowship. Some associate members, particularly those not in practice, often voluntarily chose not to apply to be a fellow due to a variety of reasons.

An associate member who has been in continuous practice in India or has worked for a commercial or government organization for at least five years and meets other conditions as prescribed can apply to the institute to get designated as a "Fellow". Responsibilities and voting rights of both types of members remain the same but only fellows can be elected to the council and regional councils of ICAI. Fellows are perceived as enjoying a higher status due to their long professional experience.

=== Practicing Chartered Accountants ===
Any member wanting to engage in public practice has to first apply for and obtain a Certificate of Practice (COP) from the Council of ICAI. Only members holding a Practicing Certificate may act as statutory auditors of Indian companies. Under section 288(2) of the Income Tax Act, 1961, a chartered accountant who holds a current certificate of practice (CoP), is considered an "accountant" and is therefore qualified to practice in tax audits required under section 44AB of the IT act.

Companies in India cannot practice profession of accountancy.

== Role of Chartered Accountants ==
Chartered accountants work in all fields of business and finance, including auditing, taxation, financial and general management. Some are engaged in public practice work, others work in the private sector and some are employed by government bodies.

== Council of the institute ==
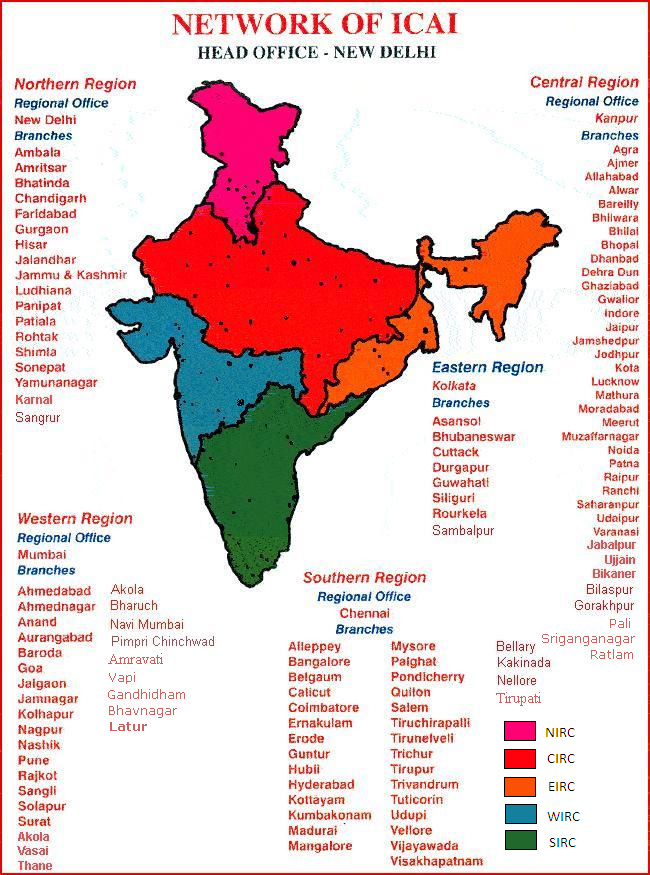
Map of India showing the jurisdictions of the five Regional Councils of ICAI

The management of the affairs of the institute is undertaken by a council constituted under the Chartered Accountants Act, 1949. The council consists of 32 elected fellow members and up to 8 members nominated by the Government of India. The elected members of the council are elected under the single transferable vote system by the members of the institute. The council is re-elected every three years. The council elects two of its members to be president and vice-president who hold office for one year. The president is the chief executive authority of the council.

=== Regions and branches ===
ICAI has five regions : Eastern, Western, Northern, Southern and Central. As on 15 July 2019, ICAI have 164 Branches so far. Out of total 164 Branches, 99 branches are having their own premises which include 14 Branches (presently functioning from Rented Premises) who have procured land on which construction is either commenced or construction is under-way. 16 Branches (functioning from own premises) have procured land where either construction has started or construction is under-way. 51 Branches do not own either land or building.

In addition to its domestic network, the institute promotes international trade integration and global professional services through its chapters and representative offices situated worldwide.

=== Presidents ===
ICAI's first president was Mr. G.P. Kapadia (1949 to 1952), and he is the first Chartered Accountant and the person who received the first membership certificate on June 9, 1950 . CA. Prasanna Kumar D. is the current president.

== Code of ethics ==
The institute has a detailed code of ethics and actions in contravention of such code results in disciplinary action against the erring members. The institute publishes a members' handbook containing the Chartered Accountants Act 1949, Chartered Accountants Regulations 1988, Professional Opportunities for Members – an Appraisal, Code of Ethics and Manual for members. These together form the basis of regulation of the profession. The council also has a Peer Review Board that ensures that in carrying out their professional attestation services assignments, the members of the institute (a) comply with the Technical Standards laid down by the institute and (b) have in place proper systems (including documentation systems) for maintaining the quality of the attestation services work they perform.

== Disciplinary process ==
The Disciplinary Directorate, the Board of Discipline, and the Disciplinary Committee form the foundation of the disciplinary process of the institute. These entities are quasi-judicial and have substantial powers like that of a Civil Court to summon and enforce attendance or require discovery and production of documents on affidavit or otherwise. The Disciplinary Directorate is headed by an officer designated as Director (Discipline). On receipt of any information or complaint that a member has allegedly engaged in any misconduct, the Director (Discipline) shall arrive at a prima facie opinion whether or not there is any misconduct. If the Director (Discipline) is of the opinion that the misconduct is covered by the items listed in the first schedule of the Chartered Accountants Act, 1949, he/she shall refer the case to the Board of Discipline. If he/she is of the Opinion that the case is covered by the Second Schedule or both schedules of the CA Act, he/she will refer the case to the Disciplinary Committee. If the Board of Discipline finds a member guilty of professional or other misconduct, it may at its discretion reprimand the member, remove the name of the member from the register of members for up to three months or impose a fine up to ₹ 1,00,000/-. If the Disciplinary Committee finds a member guilty of professional or other misconduct, it may at its discretion reprimand the member, remove the name of the member from the register of members permanently or impose a fine up to ₹ 5,000/-. Any member aggrieved by any order may approach the Appellate Authority.

It should be borne in mind that this disciplinary proceeding is not in lieu of or an alternative for criminal proceedings in a court. Criminal proceedings against a Chartered Accountant and disciplinary action by ICAI are two separate issues and one need not wait for another to be completed first.

=== Actions ===
One of the public actions of The ICAI Disciplinary Committee in the 2009–2010 time period was proceedings for professional misconduct against two auditors from the firm Price Waterhouse partners for wrongly auditing and inflating the financial statements of Satyam Computer Services Limited. The Supreme Court of India (November 2010) rejected a plea by the two charged auditors to stay the proceedings by the ICAI Disciplinary committee. The court's order came in response to the pleas of the charged auditors seeking a stay on the disciplinary proceedings against them on the ground that it violated their fundamental right against self-incrimination under Article 20 (3) of the Constitution of India.

Other publicized actions included, the SEBI referred case of a brokerage firm, Karvy, in which the internal auditors, Haribhakti & Co (an associate of BDO Global). were held guilty of negligence for failing to detect thousands of demat accounts being opened with the same address. The committee has also taken action against members for alleged irregularities in the books of Maytas Properties and Maytas Infra and the role played by their auditors. The names of the members found guilty of misconduct are published on ICAI's website. The ICAI website lists 35 as the number of cases in which inquiry was completed by the Disciplinary Committee in the past one year since February 2010. The list of members held guilty of professional or other misconduct is published periodically.

=== Request for more power ===
Many of the recent financial frauds and scams related to organizations that had multinational accounting firms as their auditors. These multinational firms cannot legally practice in India but they are practicing in India by surrogate means, operating through tie-ups with local firms, though the partners involved are from India, since only a member of the institute can be an auditor of an Indian entity. The example for this is an elaborate list, Price Waterhouse in case of Global Trust Bank Scam, again Price Waterhouse in Satyam Computer Services Limited scam, Ernst and Young in the Maytas case. ICAI lacks jurisdictional powers to punish these or for that matter any firm, as under its current regulations it only has the power to proceed against individual members. The institute has asked the Ministry of Corporate Affairs, Government of India to grant additional powers so that it may proceed against firms whose partners or employees are frequent offenders. ICAI also has sent a proposal to the Government of India to amend the Chartered Accountants Act, 1949 in order to enable to it to impose a fine of ₹ 1,00,00,000/- on audit firms if they are found guilty of colluding with companies to commit a fraud.

== Qualification ==
A person is eligible to apply for membership either by passing all three levels of examinations (Foundation, Intermediate and Final) prescribed by ICAI and completing 24 months of practical training before Final ( 12 months of additional practical training post qualification is mandatory for Certification of Practice ( CoP)) or by availing themselves of exemptions under mutual recognition agreement (MRAs).

ICAI has MRAs and MOUs with the CPA Canada, ICAEW, CPA Australia, CPA Ireland.

== Examination ==
Entry to the profession can be made by taking the CA Foundation Course after completion of schooling (12th grade). Alternatively, graduates may train as an articled assistant for three years in a chartered firm before final exam or after completion of Intermediate of Cost Management Accountant or Company Secretary. A comprehensive 100 hours of information technology training and an orientation programme for soft skills development have to be completed before being articled. ICAI will soon introduce a "New Scheme for Education and Training", wherein emphasis would be more on development of higher order skills of application, analysis and interpretation. A special feature of the new scheme would be the mandatory multi-disciplinary case study at the Final level, which would help students integrate professional knowledge in different subject areas, analyse and apply such knowledge in problem solving. The scheme also intends to focus more on practical training and will also offer self-paced online modules, where in working students can learn and qualify at their own pace.

ICAI has entered into an agreement with Indira Gandhi National Open University (IGNOU), to help CA students acquire a Bachelor's degree and master's degree by writing six papers / five papers respectively. For example, a bachelor's degree in Commerce can be obtained from IGNOU with a major in accounting and finance provided the student is able to provide the grades received in Foundation and Intermediate and pass the term end examination conducted by IGNOU. Similarly based on the grades in Final would be taken for Masters. This initiative has helped a lot of students attain both the degrees without any duplication of subjects and credits.

ICAI offers study materials and describes the syllabus in great detail via a prospectus. While ICAI claims that this study material on the website is sufficient for motivated students to study, most students opt to attend oral coaching classes or learn from e-learning portals.

== Membership through MRA ==
The second method of obtaining membership is through mutual recognition agreements or MRAs. ICAI has entered into MRAs with several institutes globally, of equivalent standing, to enable members of those institutes to acquire membership of ICAI and to enable the members of ICAI to gain membership of its counterpart in other countries. This is done by granting some exemptions in the regular scheme of examination and training.

ICAI currently has MRAs with following professional accounting bodies:

- Institute of Chartered Accountants of Nepal
- Institute of Chartered Accountants in England and Wales (since 20 November 2008)
- CPA Australia (originally signed in February 2009 and re-signed in September 2014)
- CPA Canada
- CPA Ireland
- The South African Institute of Chartered Accountants
- CPA Australia
- Chartered Accountants Australia and New Zealand (CA ANZ)
- National Board of Accountants & Auditors, Tanzania
- Institute of Certified Public Accountants of Kenya

ICAI is also in the process of negotiating MRAs with Hong Kong Institute of Certified Public Accountants and Certified General Accountants Association of Canada.

=== Technical co-operation agreements ===
The ICAI has signed a memorandum of understanding (MOU) with professional accounting bodies of various countries. These MOUs aim at establishing mutual co-operation between the two institutions for the advancement of accounting knowledge, professional and intellectual development, advancing the interests of their respective members and positively contributing to the development of the accounting profession.

Currently ICAI has MOUs with following professional accounting bodies:

- Accounting and Auditing Standards Board of Bhutan, Bhutan (signed on 22 November 2013)
- The Vietnam Association of Certified Public Accountants, Vietnam
- Higher Colleges of Technology, UAE (signed on 4 January 2011)
- College of Banking and Financial Studies, Oman
- Institute of Chartered Accountants of Nepal

The MoUs with CPA Afghanistan and Saudi Organization for Certified Public Accountants (SOCPA) are in pipeline.

== Placement ==
The institute maintains a placement portal on its website for qualified members and partially qualified students. cmib.in. The Average Package in ICAI Campus is ₹13Lakhs, placing 20-25% CA Freshers after Every Attempt. Highest Package usually goes to ₹30+Lakhs CTC & min. CTC offered is ₹9Lakhs CTC. There are total of 29 Campus Centres across India.

=== International Initiatives ===
The institute actively organizes global events to accelerate international mobility and capacity building. In 2026, it hosted the 2nd ICAI Global Summit Series at GIFT City and the ICAI UK Global Summit to strengthen the global ecosystem for professional services.

== Technical standards ==
ICAI formulates and issues technical standards to be followed by Chartered Accountants and others. Non-compliance of these standards by the members will lead to disciplinary action against them. The technical standards issued by ICAI include Accounting Standards, Engagement, and Quality Control Standards, Standards on Internal Audit, Corporate Affairs Standard, Accounting Standards for Local Bodies, etc.

=== Accounting Standards ===
As of 2010, the Institute of Chartered Accountants of India has issued 32 Accounting Standards. These are numbered AS-1 to AS-7 and AS-9 to AS-32 (AS-8 & AS-6 is no longer in force since it was merged with AS-26 and AS-10). Compliance with accounting standards issued by ICAI has become a statutory requirement with the notification of Companies (Accounting Standards) Rules, 2006 by the Government of India. Before the constitution of the National Advisory Committee on Accounting Standards (NACAS), the institute was the sole accounting standard setter in India. However NACAS is not an independent body; It can only consider accounting standards recommended by ICAI and advise the Government of India to notify them under the Companies Act 2013. Further, the Accounting Standards so notified are applicable only to companies registered under the companies act, 2013. For all other entities, the accounting standards issued by the ICAI continue to apply.

==== Convergence with IFRS ====
The inception of the idea of convergence of Indian GAAP with IFRS was made by the Prime Minister of India Dr. Manmohan Singh by committing in G20 to align Indian accounting standards with IFRS. As per the original roadmap for implementation of IFRS-converged Ind AS issued by the Government of India, initially, Ind AS were expected to be implemented from the year 2011. However, keeping in view the fact that certain issues including tax issues were still to be addressed, the Ministry of Corporate Affairs decided to postpone the date of implementation of Ind AS. For a smooth transition to IFRS, ICAI has taken up the matter of convergence with the National Advisory Committee on Accounting Standards and various regulators such as the RBI, SEBI and IRDA, CBDT. IASB, the issuer of IFRS, has also been supporting the ICAI in its endeavors towards convergence. ICAI has revised/formulated Ind AS on the basis of the amendments and new IFRS issued by the IASB subsequent to February 2011. IFRS-converged Indian Accounting Standards (Ind AS) has been implemented in India in a phased manner from 1 April 2015 being the voluntary date of adoption of Ind AS. The mandatory application of Ind AS has been restricted to listed and unlisted companies with a net worth of Rs. 500 crore and above from the accounting year beginning on or after 1 April 2016. With effect on 1 April 2017, all listed companies and unlisted companies having a net worth of Rs. 250 crore and above would be required to prepare their financial statements in accordance with the applicable Ind AS. Banks and NBFCs are also required to implement Ind AS on 1 April 2018 onwards based on the criteria of net worth.

In order to ensure that these standards are implemented in the same spirit in which these have been formulated, ICAI has been providing guidance to members through its various initiatives such as the issuance of Educational Materials on Ind AS containing Frequently Asked Questions (FAQs). For addressing transition and implementation related queries clarifications on a timely basis are also being issued by the ICAI. Queries raised are also addressed through Support-desk for implementation of Ind AS. Apart from this, Certificate Course on Ind AS, In-house training programmes on Ind AS for corporate and regulatory bodies are also being organized to educate and train the members on these standards.

=== Engagement and Quality Control Standards ===
Engagement and Quality Control Standards comprises the following Standards: 1 Standards on Auditing (SAs), to be applied in the audit of historical financial information. 2 Standards on Review Engagements (SREs), to be applied in the review of historical financial information. 3 Standards on Assurance Engagements (SAEs), to be applied in assurance engagements, other than audits and reviews of historical financial information. 4 Standards on Related Services (SRSs), to be applied to engagements involving the application of agreed-upon procedures to information, compilation engagements, and other related services engagements, as may be specified by the ICAI. The aforesaid Standards are collectively known as Engagement Standards. 5. Standards on Quality Control (SQCs) – These Standards are to be applied for all services covered by the Engagement Standards as described above. As of October 2017 ICAI has issued 46 Engagement and Quality Control Standards (formerly known as Auditing and Assurance Standards) covering various topics relating to auditing and other engagements. These standards have been harmonized with the International Standards issued by the IAASB of the IFAC except for two standards i.e. ISA 600 and ISAE 3000.

=== Forensic Accounting and Investigation Standards (FAIS) ===
The Institute of Chartered Accountants of India (ICAI) has constituted a committee to deliberate on FAIS, which are expected to be framed by the end of this year 2020. The Institute of Chartered Accountants of India will be the first body in the accounting world to develop a full set of FAIS standards for forensic professionals and stakeholders, The proposed standards would help Forensic Accounting and Investigation professionals to conduct their examinations in a highly professional manner and collect evidences which may be subject to high level of scrutiny in a court of law.

== See also ==
- Auditing in India
- Education in India
- Public Accounts Committee (PAC)
