= WTS Global =

International network of professional service firms

- Industry: Professional services
- Founded: 2003
- Headquarters: Rotterdam, Netherlands
- Area served: Worldwide
- Services: Tax advice
- Website: wts.com

WTS Global is a network of tax consulting firms whose partners operate worldwide. Although WTS Global is headquartered in the Netherlands, the group has German roots. The international network WTS Global was founded in 2003 by the Germany-based WTS Group. Unlike the largest tax consulting firms (namely the Big Four), WTS does not perform auditing services but focuses on tax consulting.

== See also ==
- Accounting network
- Big Four accounting firms: KPMG, PwC, EY, Deloitte
- BDO, Crowe, Grant Thornton
