= Grant Thornton LLP =

American public accounting firm

- Type: Limited liability partnership
- Industry: Accounting, tax, and business advisory services
- Founded: 1924; 102 years ago (as Alexander Grant & Co.); 1986 (as Grant Thornton LLP)
- Founder: Alexander Richardson Grant
- Headquarters: Grant Thornton Tower; Chicago, Illinois, U.S.
- Key people: Jim Peko, CEO; Rick Surett, CFO
- Products: Professional services
- Revenue: ▲US$1.9 billion (2019)
- Number of employees: 8,500+
- Parent: New Mountain Capital

Grant Thornton LLP is the 9th largest accounting firm in the United States with 59 offices across the US, 8,500+ employees, and annual revenues of US$1.9 billion. It is the United States member firm of Grant Thornton International, the 7th largest global accounting network by revenue.

In 2024, the partners of Grant Thornton sold a majority of the firm to New Mountain Capital, a private equity firm, which has significantly impacted the business.

== History ==
=== Early history ===
In 1924, Alexander Richardson Grant, a 26 year old senior accountant with Ernst & Ernst (later Ernst & Young) decided to leave the firm and start his own business with William O’Brien. Alexander Grant & Co. was built in Chicago and it provided services as a middle market firm. The firm was growing rapidly and nationally under the guidance of several new leaders during the next three decades.

In 1961, the company established its national office in Chicago and earned net revenue of more than $5 million. During this time, a competitive firm that was also committed to providing services to middle market established in Europe, and this firm later became known as Binder Dijker Otte & Co. (BDO).

During the mid-1960s, the firm decided to expand its business internationally. In 1969, Alexander Grant & Co. merged with companies from Australia, Canada and the United Kingdom to form an organization called Alexander Grant Tansley Witt.

By 1980, Alexander Grant & Co. had joined with 49 international accounting firms, including a UK firm named Thornton Baker, and formed a professional global network, Grant Thornton International.

In 1985, Alexander Grant & Co. merged with Fox & Co. and became the ninth largest accounting firm in the United States, just behind the nation's "Big Eight" firms. At that time, the company had 80 offices and more than 3,000 employees.

In 1986, Alexander Grant & Co. changed its name to Grant Thornton, resulted from its affiliation with the United Kingdom firm Thornton Baker, which also changed its name to Grant Thornton.

=== Recent history ===
In 2002, Grant Thornton acquired 7 offices, 43 partners and 396 employees from ex-Arthur Andersen.

In June 2014, Grant Thornton announced J. Michael McGuire as the firm's chief executive officer.

In August 2019, Brad Preber assumed CEO duties of the firm.

In March 2020, Grant Thornton LLP teamed up with GroupSense to offer digital crime mitigation technology.

In March 2024, the company announced a deal where private equity firm New Mountain Capital would acquire a majority stake. At the time of the announcement, it was the seventh biggest accounting firm in the US, after the Big Four (Deloitte, EY, PwC, and KPMG), RSM, and BDO. The move came amid ongoing private equity interest in the accounting space, with Baker Tilly receiving investment of $1 billion from a different private equity group, Hellman & Friedman, the prior month.

As a result of the sale, the firm transitioned to an alternative practice structure, with Grant Thornton LLP engaging in attest services and Grant Thornton Advisors LLC handling business advisory and non-attest services.

On July 29, 2026, Grant Thornton entered an agreement to acquire CBIZ, LLC, which upon completion would make it the "fifth-largest U.S. provider of professional services, tax, and advisory services, with more than $5 billion in annual domestic revenue."

== Operations ==
Headquartered in Chicago, Grant Thornton LLP has three service lines: audit, tax, and advisory services. Specific advisory services and areas of expertise include: Sarbanes-Oxley compliance, mergers and acquisitions advice, tax, and business valuations. Target industries include construction, distribution, energy, financial services, food and beverage, healthcare, hospitality and restaurants, life sciences, manufacturing, not-for-profit organizations, private equity, real estate, retail, technology, and transportation.

== Services ==
Grant Thornton offers three main service lines:

- Audit/Assurance: Provides not only the financial statement audits, but also uses professional tools and processes to conduct integrated audits required by SEC and under the Sarbanes-Oxley Act.
- Tax: Offers clients professional tax services including: federal, local and state, international tax advisory & compliance, compensation & benefits consulting, private wealth services, and tax accounting & risk advisory services.
- Advisory: services in business strategy, governance, risk & compliance, performance improvement, and information technology.

=== Tax desk ===
Tax desks is developed by Grant Thornton US and it connects other member firms in different countries to help clients grow their business and solve their common problems in the global market. Grant Thornton US has established the desks between the United States and the UK, the United States and China, and the United States and Japan.

== Controversies ==
- Several audit deficiencies in the firm's audit work at eight companies were found by Public Company Oversight Board when it was doing the inspection of Grant Thornton's 2005 audit. In the PCAOB's report, the Board concluded that the firm didn't have enough evidence to support its audit opinions. Grant Thornton responded to the PCAOB's criticism on June 4, 2007. In its response letter, the firm wrote "We strongly disagree with the use of overly broad comments such as ‘failed to identify’, ‘failed to perform,’".
- In April 2012, Grant Thornton was accused by its client Bill Yung and his family. The firm hid real information from its clients and sold a tax shelter to them. There was a 90% chance the IRS would reject the shelter. Kentucky State Court ordered Grant Thornton to pay $20 million in compensatory damages and $80 million in punitive damage.

== Sponsorship ==
- In December 2017, Grant Thornton signed a five-year marketing partnership deal with the PGA Tour and replaced Pricewaterhouse Coopers as the "Player's Partner". During this time, Grant Thornton also entered into a separate deal with professional golfer Rickie Fowler.
- In March 2016, Grant Thornton signed a multi-year agreement with the National Center for the Middle Market (NCMM). In 2015, Grant Thornton has become a multi-year sponsor of the Charlotte Hornets basketball team. This partnership includes a multi-year advertising arrangement that renamed of the Crown Club as the "Grant Thornton Crown Club."
- In 2022, Grant Thornton entered a partnership with historically black colleges and universities' (HBCU) golf programs, including Alabama State, North Carolina A&T State University, Prairie View A&M University, Tennessee State University, and Texas Southern University. The goal of the sponsorship was to strengthen university golf programs and provide student-athletes with enhanced opportunities for professional development on campus. This included sponsoring tournaments and facility improvements during the 2022-23 school year.
