= Partner (business rank) =

A partner in a law firm, accounting firm, consulting firm, or financial firm is a highly ranked position, traditionally indicating co-ownership of a partnership in which the partners were entitled to a share of the profits as "equity partners". The title can also be used in corporate entities where equity is held by shareholders.

== Law firms ==
In law firms, partners are primarily those senior lawyers who are responsible for generating the firm's revenue. The standards for equity partnership vary from firm to firm. Many law firms have a "two-tiered" partnership structure, in which some partners are designated as "salaried partners" or "non-equity" partners, and are allowed to use the "partner" title but do not share in profits. This position is often given to lawyers on track to become equity partners so that they can more easily generate business; it is typically a "probationary" status for associates (or former equity partners who do not generate enough revenue to maintain equity partner status). The distinction between equity and non-equity partners is often internal to the firm and not disclosed to clients, although a typical equity partner could be compensated three times as much as a non-equity partner billing at the same hourly rate. In America, senior lawyers not on track for partnership often use the title "of counsel", which differs to the use the titles of Counsel and "Senior Counsel" used in most Commonwealth countries.

Partner compensation varies considerably. A 2012 survey by Major, Lindsey & Africa found that law firm partners' average annual compensation was $681,000 ($896,000 for equity partners, $335,000 for non-equity partners) and tended to go up based on number of years in the partnership:

- 5 or fewer years: $399,001
- 6–10 years: $633,001
- 11–20 years: $790,001
- 20+ years: $926,001

== Accounting firms ==
Accounting firms were traditionally established as legal partnerships with partners sharing the profits. Today, the financial and consulting services firms which originated from accounting firms, such as the Big Four accounting firms, retain the title of Partner as a senior position and to indicate a profit-sharing status. To become a partner is considered a significant career milestone.

Based on the role, tradition or local regulations partners may include the:

- Managing partner/country partner – partner in charge of the day-to-day running of the business
- Senior partner – partner of many years of service
- Principal – partner who is not a CPA/CA

A modern procedure is to take the role of associate partner before becoming a partner in some consulting services.

== Financial industry ==
Many major investment banks were historically structured as partnerships, and some such as Goldman Sachs maintain a class of "partners" at the top of their corporate hierarchy. In such firms, the "partners" are typically the highest-compensated managing directors as well as more senior executives. The term is also used for senior executives in the private equity industry. In these industries, partners are often compensated millions of dollars per year.

== See also ==
- Up or out
