= ALFA International =

Global legal network

- Type: 501(c)(6) non-profit corporation registered in Delaware
- Founded: 1980
- Headquarters: Chicago, United States
- Number of locations: 300
- Area served: Africa, Asia, Australia/New Zealand, Europe, North America, South America
- Key people: Edward T. Hayes, Chair, Board of Directors; Jessica Zaroski Bauer, Chief Executive Officer
- Website: ALFA International

ALFA International The Global Legal Network Inc., commonly known as ALFA International, is a global legal network consisting of 140 independent law firms, including 80 U.S. law firms and 60 member firms in other countries. As with other types of professional services networks, the organization serves as a business referral and resource pooling network between member law firms.

== History ==
The organization, which was originally named the American Law Firm Association, was founded in 1980. It is the oldest U.S.-based law firm network At its creation, it consisted of 12 U.S. law firms that performed insurance defense work for insurance companies with nationwide operations. During the 1980s, ALFA expanded to include more than 60 law firms in the United States. The membership included firms that handled other types of litigation, not just insurance defense, as well as transactional legal work. During the 1990s, ALFA membership grew to include 80 law firms in the United States and 25 law firms in Europe, Latin American, and the Pacific Rim. During the 2000s, ALFA expanded its international membership to include 60 member firms.

== Membership ==
As of 2019, the ALFA International network comprises approximately 140 law firms and approximately 10,000 lawyers in 300 offices worldwide. ALFA International membership is exclusive to one law firm in each metropolitan area, state, or country. Member law firms are full-service corporate firms, and on average, each firm consists of approximately 75 attorneys.

Firms must undergo a rigorous application process prior to being admitted to the organization. Member firms are then regularly audited, and underperforming firms may be removed from membership. Member law firms have no legal ties to one another.

Notable member firms include:

- Anthony Harper (New Zealand)
- Barun Law LLC (South Korea)
- Atsumi & Sakai (Japan)
- Leake & Andersson LLP (United States)
- Fylgia AB (Sweden)
- DSM Avocats à la Cour (Luxembourg).

ALFA International is also recognized as a top-tier legal network by independent rankings. It is ranked in Band 1 of the Chambers and Partners Global Guide for Leading Law Firm Networks – Global Market Leaders, and in Band 3 in the Asia-Pacific regional guide for Leading Regional Law Firm Networks.

== See also ==
- Umbrella organization
- Business networking
- Professional services networks
- Multidisciplinary professional services networks
- Law firm network
