= Han Kun Law Offices =

International law firm headquartered in Beijing

Han Kun Law Offices 漢坤律師事務所
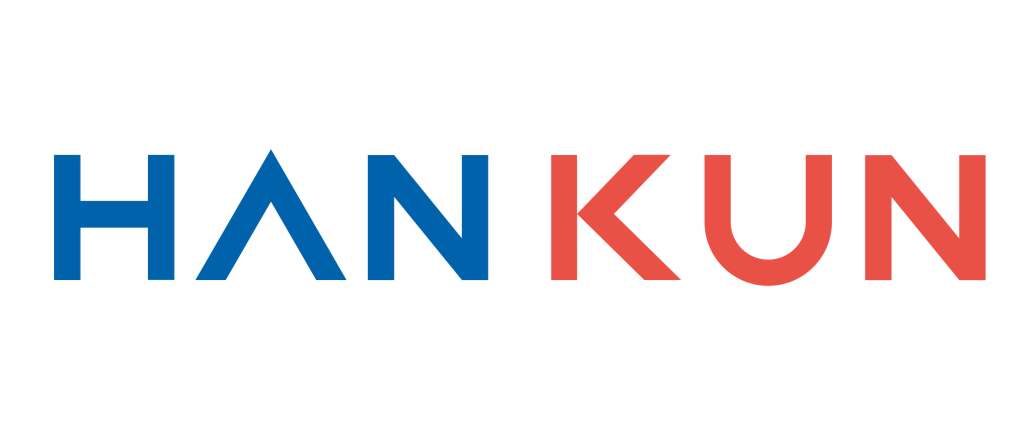
- Headquarters: Beijing, China
- No. of offices: 10
- No. of attorneys: Approximately 800
- No. of employees: Approximately 1000
- Major practice areas: Full service
- Date founded: 2004
- Company type: Law firm
- Website: www.hankunlaw.com/en/

Han Kun Law Offices, commonly known as Han Kun, is a multinational law firm headquartered in Beijing with domestic offices across China, and international offices in Hong Kong, Singapore, New York City, Silicon Valley and London. Han Kun is considered one of the most elite law firms in China, known for its expertise in complex cross-border and domestic transactions. Han Kun is also the exclusive China law firm member of WSG and Pacific Rim Advisory Council.

== History ==
China

Han Kun was founded in Beijing in 2004.

In 2009, Han Kun opened its Shanghai and Shenzhen offices.

In 2014, Han Kun entered the Hong Kong market through an association with a Hong Kong law firm. The Hong Kong office is Han Kun's first office outside of mainland China.

In April 2022, Han Kun opened its Haikou office.

In July 2022, Han Kun opened its Wuhan office.

In November 2022, Han Kun's Hong Kong office merged with its Hong Kong associated law firm. Upon the merger, a Hong Kong law firm operated by Han Kun under the name “Han Kun Law Offices LLP” was duly established.

International

In June 2023, Han Kun opened its first international office in Singapore.

In December 2023, Han Kun opened its New York office.

In June 2025, Han Kun opened its Silicon Valley office.

In September 2025, Han Kun opened its London office.

== Main practice areas ==
Han Kun's main practice areas include:

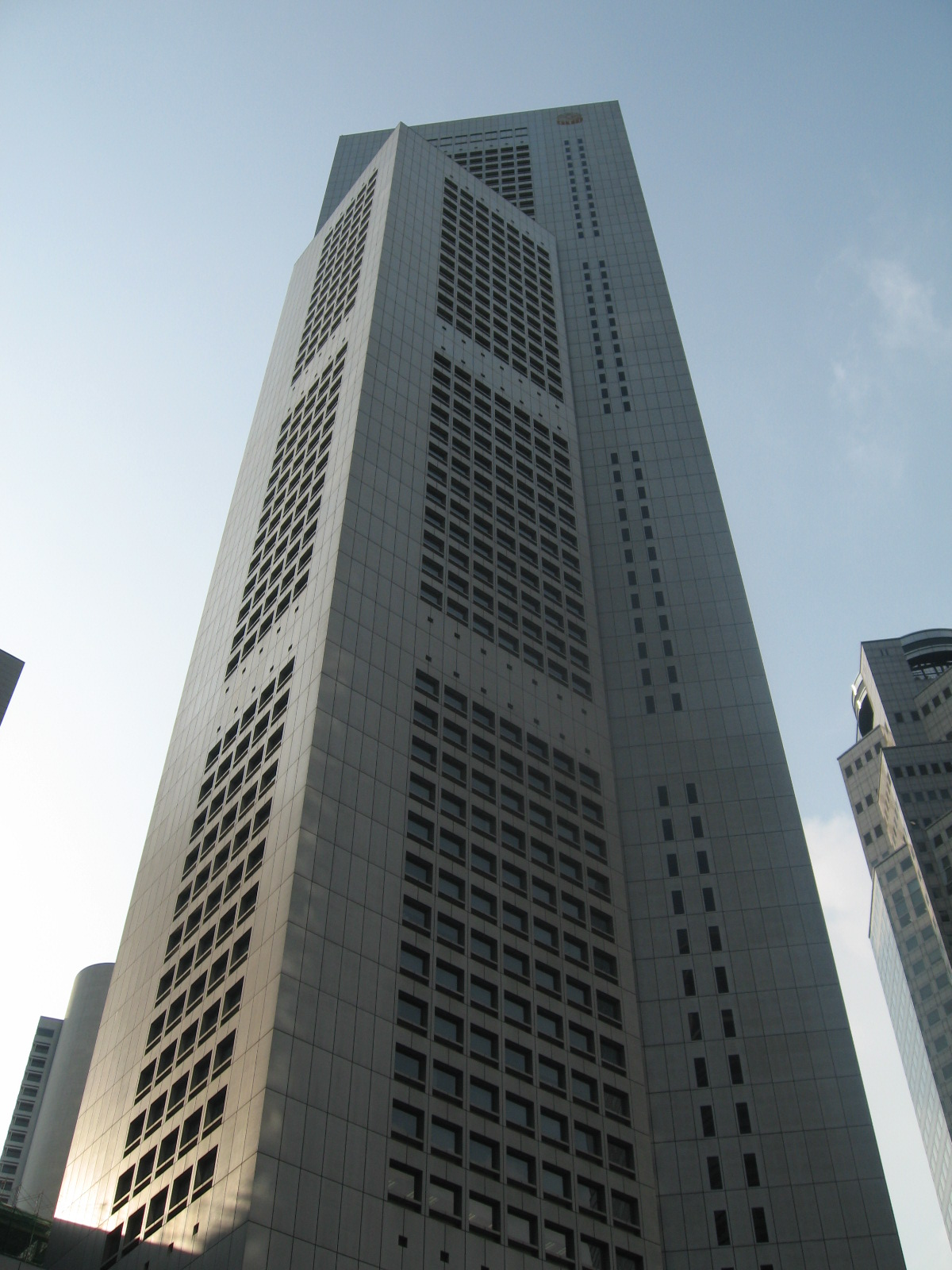
One Raffles Place, where Han Kun Singapore is located.

- Antitrust and competition
- Aviation
- Banking and Finance
- Capital markets & securities
- Compliance
- Dispute resolution
- Family law
- Financial technology
- Foreign direct investment
- Healthcare & life sciences
- Infrastructure, project financing & real estate projects
- Intellectual property
- Mergers and acquisitions
- Private equity and venture capital financings

== Clients ==
Han Kun's key clients include, among others, J.P. Morgan, UBS, Goldman Sachs, BofA Merrill Lynch, Tencent, Baidu, Bytedance, JD.com, Zhihu, Meituan, Nio, and Air China.
