= JuriNet =

Company in Finland

JuriNet Ltd
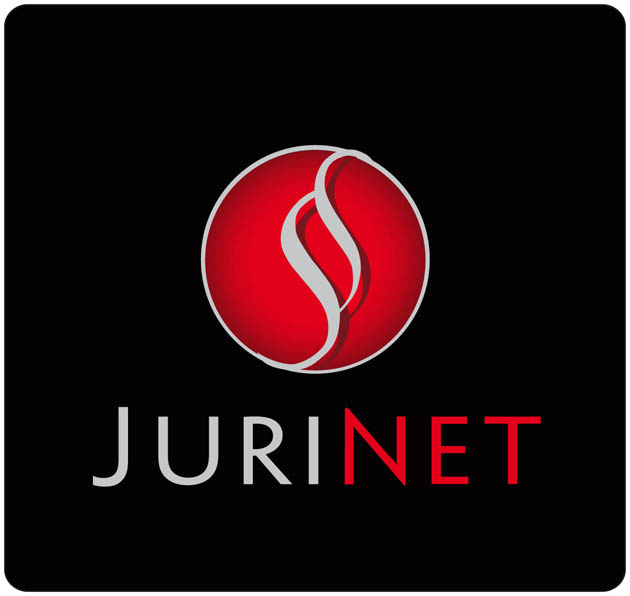
- Type: Limited company
- Industry: Professional services networks
- Founded: Tampere, Finland, 2011
- Headquarters: Helsinki, Tampere, Finland
- Key people: Markus Talvio (CEO)
- Services: Legal and business services
- Website: juri.net

JuriNet Ltd is a syndicate of law offices and business partners in Finland and worldwide and one of the biggest Finnish B2B service provider to offer law firms a customer-oriented marketing and information channel.

== JuriNet ==
JuriNet Ltd was established in Tampere in 2011 as a marketing entity of 13 Finnish law offices and as the first one of its kind in Tampere Region. In spring 2012 company started to expand abroad and it has developed into a growing network of 100 lawyers and business professionals from Finland and abroad.

=== JuriNet Network ===
JuriNet Ltd is a head of the network JuriNet which has been built on principles of professional services networks. The network is working under umbrella organizational structure. In each country where JuriNet is going to expand, one JuriNet representative company is situated who creates the network of law firms and business partners. Those network members subsequently cooperate on solving specific law cases, preserving their economic and legal independence. JuriNet Ltd manages the network, provides corporate marketing and evaluates fulfilling membership requirements by the law firms and business partners.

JuriNet Ltd. was awarded the recognition of Fair Employer by The Association of Finnish Lawyers.

== See also ==
- Professional services networks
- Law firm network
