= Grant Thornton =

British accounting professional services network

Grant Thornton International Ltd.
- Type: Global network of independent member firms
- Industry: Professional services
- Founded: 1980; 46 years ago
- Headquarters: GTIL: 8 Finsbury Circus, London, England, U.K.
- Key people: Greg Keith (CEO)
- Products: Assurance services, tax advisory, specialist advisory services, and management consulting
- Revenue: ▲US$7.5 billion (2023)
- Number of employees: 72,858 (2023)
- Website: grantthornton.global

Grant Thornton is a multinational professional services network based in London, United Kingdom. It is the seventh-largest in the world by revenue and the sixth-largest by number of employees. The network consists of independent accounting and consulting member firms that provide assurance, tax, and advisory services to privately held businesses, public interest entities, and public sector organisations.

Grant Thornton is composed of member firms affiliated with Grant Thornton International Ltd., a private company limited by guarantee, incorporated in England and Wales. Grant Thornton is a not-for-profit, non-practising, international umbrella membership entity, and has no share capital.

Member firms within the Grant Thornton network operate in 147 markets employing around 73,000 personnel for a combined global revenue of US$7.5 billion.

== History ==
=== 20th century ===
The earliest origins of the name date back to 1904, when the UK firm of Thornton and Thornton was formed in Oxford. Through a series of name changes this firm merged in 1959 with another UK firm, Baker & Co, which traced its origins to 1868, to form the firm Thornton Baker. In 1975, Thornton Baker merged with Kidston, Jackson, McBain, a UK firm which traced its origins to the Glaswegian accountant, Robert McCowan, who set up in practice in 1844, and was a founder of the Institute of Accountants and Actuaries in Glasgow in 1853.

In the United States, Alexander Richardson Grant founded Alexander Grant & Co in Chicago in 1924.Grant had been a senior accountant with Ernst & Ernst (now EY). Alexander Grant provided services to mid-sized companies.

When Grant died in 1938, Alexander Grant & Co survived the change in leadership and continued to grow nationally. In 1969, Alexander Grant & Co joined with firms from Australia, Canada, and the United States to establish the organisation of Alexander Grant Tansley Witt. This organisation operated successfully for 10 years.

In 1980, Alexander Grant & Co and Thornton Baker, firms with similar qualities, clients, personnel numbers and values, joined with 49 other firms to form a global organisation, Grant Thornton. In 1986, Alexander Grant & Co and Thornton Baker changed their names to Grant Thornton, reflecting their mutual affiliation and strategic alignment.

=== 21st century ===
In December 2019 Grant Thornton placed in the top 50 global employers for diversity and inclusion (D&I), according to a new index developed by Universum. More than 247,000 business and engineering/IT students rated Grant Thornton against support for gender equality, commitment to diversity & inclusion and respect for its people. Their perception of Grant Thornton, against these three categories, places the network 28th in the list, alongside some of the world's most well-known and respected global brands.

In 2018 Grant Thornton UK LLP, the UK member firm of the network, was fined £4 million for audit misconduct after a former partner joined the audit committees of two organisations while Grant Thornton UK LLP was still auditing them. Later that year, for unrelated reasons, Grant Thornton UK LLP's chief executive Sacha Romanovitch, their first female chief executive, announced she would step down.

In September 2019, Grant Thornton (along with other defendants) entered into a settlement agreement with VEREIT stockholders to settle pending class action litigation against Grant Thornton regarding among other things alleged violations of Section 11 of the 1933 Act (In re American Realty Capital Properties, Inc. Litigation and the remaining opt-out actions), at a cost to Grant Thornton of $49 million.

Also in 2019, the US firm in the network declared their highest turnover in history of $1.9 billion which was a YoY increase of 5.4% over the previous year.

In January 2024, the company announced the appointment of Malcolm Gomersall as its new chief executive, replacing David Dunckley who stepped down earlier in the same month.

In November 2024, Grant Thornton UK agreed to sell its majority stake to private equity firm Cinven, marking one of the largest private equity deals in the UK accounting sector, which valued the firm at approximately £1.3 billion. This decision came after proposals of merging with US sister firm Grant Thornton LLP and bids from Swedish firm EQT did not go through. The transaction remains subject to partner ratification and regulatory approvals.

== Recent significant mergers ==
In 1987, Grant Thornton merged with Carter Chaloner & Kearns.

Grant Thornton UK merged with RSM Robson Rhodes in July 2007.

Grant Thornton Russia merged with Rosexpertiza in January 2012. The same year, Grant Thornton China merged with Ascenda CPA.

In May 2012, Grant Thornton Australia merged with several former BDO offices in Melbourne and Sydney.

In July 2013, Grant Thornton Johannesburg merged with the local PKF member firm.

In February 2018, Grant Thornton South Africa merged with SizweNtsalubaGobodo. In July of that year, Grant Thornton Japan added the Yusei Audit Co. and Yamada & partners Certified Public Tax Accountants’ Co. to the network, bringing Grant Thornton's total headcount in Japan to over 1,600 people with combined revenues of over US$170 million.

In July 2026, Grant Thornton entered an agreement to buyout CBIZ for an enterprise valuation of US$5 billion. The deal closed on October 27, 2026 and resulted in the 5th largest professional services provider in the United States.

== Member firms ==
Although many of the firms now carry the Grant Thornton name, they are not all members of one international partnership. Each member firm is a separate national entity, and governs itself and manages its administrative matters independently on a local basis. This is similar to other professional services networks.

Grant Thornton member firms service international work through their local International Business Centres — located in 60 major commercial centres throughout the world. For example, Raymond Chabot Grant Thornton is a Canadian member firm since 1997.

Grant Thornton International Ltd. carries out an annual global research project: The Grant Thornton International Business Report, which (since 1992) surveys the views and expectations of over 10,000 privately held mid-market businesses across 28 economies.

== Controversies and criticisms ==
=== Nichols plc and the University of Salford ===
In 2018, the Financial Reporting Council (FRC) fined Grant Thornton £4m, later reduced to £3m, for misconduct over its audits of Nichols plc and the University of Salford. Three partners were given personal fines of £60,000.

=== Patisserie Valerie ===
In 2021 the FRC fined Grant Thornton £4m for failures in its audits of Patisserie Valerie. The £4m fine was reduced to £2.34m, mainly due to Grant Thornton's co-operation with the investigation. The auditor responsible, David Newstead, was also fined £150,000, reduced to £87,750, and was banned from carrying out audits for three years.

Grant Thornton had lost the audit of Patisserie Valerie in 2019 after it failed to spot a £94m accounting black hole in its books, thereby triggering an investigation by the FRC. Patisserie Valerie went into liquidation in January 2019. Later, the chain was found to have overstated its cash position by £30m and failed to disclose overdrafts of nearly £10m. The liquidation lead to the closure of 70 stores and more than 900 job losses.

The company's chief executive, David Dunckley, told UK Members of Parliament it was not his firm's job to uncover fraud or to judge whether a company's financial figures were correct. Discussing the company's failure to uncover fraud at Patisserie Valerie, he said: “If people are colluding and there is a sophisticated fraud, that may not be caught by normal audit procedures.” Rachel Reeves MP said “But in a shop that sells tea and cakes, you’d sort of think that might be spotted. It’s not a multinational complex organisation.” She also said that the FRC's rules require auditors to spot material misstatements where they are due to fraud or error.

Restructuring firm FRP Advisory investigated whether it could claim against Grant Thornton for failures to identify suspected wrongdoing with Patisserie Valerie accounts, and in November 2020, it issued a claim for damages against Grant Thornton in respect of "negligent audits" of the group companies' financial statements.

=== Interserve ===
In 2019 the FRC instituted an investigation into Grant Thornton's audits of the failed outsourcing company Interserve between 2015 and 2017. Interserve had amassed debts of £738m following numerous acquisitions, a failed probation service contract and an investment in energy-from-waste plants. Grant Thornton and the partner involved were fined £1.3m by the FRC in 2021 for 'scepticism failure'.

=== £650,000 fine for the audit of an unnamed company ===
The FRC fined Grant Thornton £650,000 over a series of errors in its 2016 audit of an unnamed company. It found that the auditor had failed to adequately gauge the true value of the company's assets, before flagging them as a “significant risk”. The regulator said the firm had selected too small a sample size and had placed “undue reliance” on the externally appointed experts rather than its own specialist. The FRC also said the auditor had failed “to exercise sufficient professional scepticism and to prepare adequate audit documentation.”

=== Sports Direct ===
The FRC conducted an investigation into Grant Thornton's 2016 audit of Sports Direct. The sports retailer used Barlin Delivery to deliver merchandise to its customers, and in the process made large undisclosed payments to Barlin, which was owned by John Ashley, the brother of Sports Direct's owner Mike Ashley. The FRC examined Grant Thornton's failure to disclose the relationship between Sports Direct and Barlin. In 2020 the UK Court of Appeal determined that Sports Direct did not have to disclose 40 documents sought by the FRC because they were covered by legal privilege.

=== Conviviality Retail ===
The FRC fined the company £1.95m for ethical failures after it tried to conceal evidence of involvement in the audit of the failed alcohol retailer Conviviality Retail. The regulator found that the company had not maintained an independent stance during the audit and had committed “firm-wide” ethical failings between 2014 and 2017. Senior manager Natasha Toy was severely reprimanded after she tried to remove an entry from the audit file which indicated involvement.

=== Assetco ===
Grant Thornton was ordered to pay £21 million, the second-largest award against a UK auditor, in damages to its former client AssetCo, a fire engine leasing company, plus £5 million to pay Assetco's legal costs. The judge found it had committed negligence “of the utmost gravity”. An appeal judge reduced the damages to £20.8m, before a 25% deduction for contributory negligence.

=== Brighthouse liquidation ===
After being appointed as the liquidator of the failed retailer Brighthouse, Grant Thornton was accused of maximising returns to creditors at the expense of vulnerable customers. The company was found to be offering the 140,000 rent-to-own customers an initial 28-day payment holiday, one-third of the period recommended by the FCA. Mick McAteer, co-founder of the Financial Inclusion Centre thinktank, said: “There is a potential conflict between the interests of the administrator – and those they represent – and the vulnerable customers who owe money to BrightHouse."

=== Corruption ===
In September 2022, Western Australia's Corruption and Crime Commission (CCC) found that Grant Thornton Australia had bribed senior public servants to secure lucrative consulting work from the state government. A CCC report found that two senior officials in the Department of Communities had been given over $100,000 worth of alcohol, meals, gifts, sporting tickets, flights and accommodation. Additionally, Grant Thornton employed a family member of one of the public servants in a no-work job. In return, the public servants breached state government procurement policies, including by engaging in bid rigging, ultimately directing $2.1 million in consulting work to Grant Thornton.

== See also ==
- Accounting networks and associations
- BDO Global
- Big Four accounting firms: KPMG, PwC, EY, and Deloitte
- Crowe Global
- Grant Thornton LLP
- Professional services networks
