= Association of European Attorneys =

International network of independent law firms

Association of European Attorneys (AEA; Spanish: Asociación Europea de Abogados), also known as the AEA International Lawyers Network, is an international network of independent law firms founded in 2004. The organization facilitates cooperation and referrals between law firms operating in different jurisdictions.

== History and development ==
AEA was established in 2004 as a lawyers' network initially focused on Europe and subsequently expanded internationally.

In 2020, Spanish legal publication ProDespachos reported that AEA had developed a network of 370 law firms in 115 countries.

In an interview published by Legal Today in September 2020, AEA president Pedro Beltrán described the development of the network, its international expansion and its system of selecting member firms. At that time, he stated that AEA comprised 460 law firms in 113 countries.

By February 2023, Legal Today reported that the network had grown to 741 law firms and that Spanish firm Martínez-Echevarría had become a member.

The announcement concerning Martínez-Echevarría subsequently attracted coverage in Spanish legal news publication Confilegal. The publication reported a disagreement over the way the relationship between the law firm and AEA had initially been described. Martínez-Echevarría characterized its relationship with AEA as an affiliation rather than an integration and stated that it did not imply a change in the firm's international strategy.

Later that month, Confilegal reported that AEA and Martínez-Echevarría had resolved the disagreement and issued a joint communication confirming their intention to continue their collaboration.

The headquarters of the Association of European Attorneys are located in Berlin, on Leipziger Platz, close to Potsdamer Platz, in the historic Mosse Palais.

AEA currently comprises 1,657 law firms across 160 countries on five continents.

== Activities ==
AEA operates as a network of independent law firms rather than as a single multinational law firm. Member firms use the network for cross-border cooperation and the referral of legal matters requiring assistance in other jurisdictions.

The organization also holds international congresses for lawyers from its member firms and other participants. Legal Today reported in 2025 that AEA had organized 18 international congresses since its establishment. The publication reported attendance of 318 lawyers from 88 countries at the 2023 Vienna congress and 379 lawyers from 87 countries at the subsequent Budapest congress.

Following the Madrid Congress in 2025 and the Paris Congress in 2026, London will host the next edition of the AEA International Congress on 27 and 28 May 2027, according to the organization's website.

In 2020, the African law-firm alliance LEX Africa announced a non-exclusive relationship with AEA intended to facilitate cooperation between members of the two networks and participation in their respective conferences.

== Leadership ==
Pedro Beltrán has served as president of AEA since its establishment.

American attorney Michael R. Jackson serves as First Vice-President.

AEA also has an international structure of vice-presidents and representatives designed to support its activities across the different regions in which it operates.

This structure currently includes 37 vice-presidents in Europe, 29 in Asia, 21 in Africa, 17 in the Americas and one in Oceania.

In May 2023, Spanish legal publication Economist & Jurist reported the appointment of lawyer Antonio Benítez Ostos as a vice-president of AEA and as worldwide director of its administrative-law section.

== See also ==
- Law firm network
