= Inter Revisjon =

Norwegian accountancy companies

Inter Revisjon was until July 2011 a chain of accountancy companies located in Norway. Member companies mainly execute financial audit and related consultant services.

Inter Revisjon was established in December 1985, and is wholly owned by its Norwegian members. It was one of Norway's largest auditing chains.

Inter Revisjon had at the most 40 local offices across Norway, with approx. 400 employees. Head office was located in Trondheim. Most of the 18,000 clients were small and medium-sized enterprises.

Summer 2011 the chain merged into BDO Norway, which is member of the world's fifth largest accountancy network, BDO International.
