= BDO Global =

International network of professional service firms

BDO
- Type: Global professional services network
- Industry: Accounting; Audit; Consulting; Tax
- Founded: 1963 (in 1973, European members took on the current name)
- Founders: Hans Otte and M. L. Seidman
- Headquarters: Zaventem, Belgium
- Key people: Patrick Kramer, Global CEO
- Services: Professional services
- Revenue: ▲US$15 billion (2024)
- Number of employees: 119,611 (2024)
- Website: www.bdo.global

BDO (an acronym for Binder Dijker Otte) is an international professional services network of public accounting, tax, consulting and business advisory firms headquartered in Zaventem, Belgium. The network is coordinated by BDO Global Coordination B.V., a limited liability company incorporated in Belgium, while each BDO member firm is part of BDO International Limited, a UK company limited by guarantee.

BDO is the fifth-largest accounting network in the world, with global income of its member firms totalling US$ 15 billion in 2024. Each BDO member firm is an independent legal entity in its own country. The network was founded in 1963 as Binder Seidman International Group by firms from Canada, Germany, the Netherlands, the UK and the US. In 1973, the organisation adopted the name BDO, made up from the initials of the three founding firms: Binder (UK), Dijker (Netherlands) and Otte (Germany).

== Operations by country ==
=== Australia ===
Established in 1975, BDO Australia has offices in Brisbane, Cairns, Sunshine Coast, Sydney, Melbourne, Hobart, Adelaide, Perth and Darwin. It offers financial services and business advisory services.

While starting as an association of independently owned accounting firms, BDO Australia has since undergone several significant mergers that include:

- 1988 – BDO Nelson Parkhill and Parkhill Stirling merge to create BDO Nelson Wheeler. Local offices are established in each state.
- 2006 – BDO and Horwath networks merge in Australia.
- 2012 – BDO and PKF East Coast Practice (ECP) merge in Australia.
- 2020 – As the first phase of integrating into one Australian firm, BDO in Brisbane (including both Brisbane and Sunshine Coast offices), and ECP (Sydney and Melbourne) merge.

In mid 2024, BDO established an office in Canberra, the capital of Australia, for its federal government advisory sector.

=== Canada ===
BDO Canada is one of Canada's largest accounting services firms. Founded by James M. Dunwoody (affectionately known as "The Colonel" by BDO's employees) it opened its first location in the 1920s in Winnipeg, Manitoba. By the early 2000s, Dunwoody and BDO Ward Mallette, a firm based out of Toronto, had merged. The union also consolidated the firm's affiliation with BDO International, a global network of national accounting firms.

In 2007, BDO had 95 offices across Canada, with 1,200 professionals and over 300 partners. BDO's services run from assurance, accounting and taxation services to financial advisory and corporate recovery. The company has merged a number of times, including a merger announced in October 2009 with the accounting firm of Hudson LLP.

From 1 January 2010 'Dunwoody' was dropped from the company name to coincide with a global rebrand which saw all of the BDO member firms change their names to BDO. The rebrand, which included design, messaging, all of the separate global websites, marketing collateral and trickle-down implementation across the 110-country network took just over five months. The intention was to create a global consistency, so that the BDO network could be presented as a single entity.

=== Chile ===
BDO Auditores & Consultores Ltda. is the Chilean member of the global network of BDO International. It has 3 offices in Santiago, Viña del Mar and Temuco, and more than 300 partners and staff. Among others, they provide services such as Audit, IFRS, BSO (Outsourcing), Tax & Legal, and Advisory.

=== China ===
BDO China Shu Lun Pan CPAs ("Shu Lun Pan CPAs") was founded by ShuLun Pan in Shanghai in 1927. It was one of the earliest accounting firms in China.

Lixin Certified Tax Agents Co., Ltd. ("Lixin"), is a member firm of BDO International, with its head office located in Shanghai. It is a professional tax agents company under the "LIXIN" brand. Approved by the State Administration for Industry and Commerce of the People's Republic of China (SAIC) and Shanghai Certified Tax Agents Association, BDO Lixin Tax was established by six leading A-level tax agent corporations from across China. The name of the enterprise's legal representative is Zilin Zou and the registered capital of enterprise is 50 million RMB. BDO Lixin Tax has obtained AAAAA level, which is the highest standard, from the China Certified Tax Agents Association.

In Hong Kong, BDO McCabe Lo was merged with K.L. Lee & Partners in 2005 and Shu Lun Pan Horwath Hong Kong in 2009. In 2010, the businesses of BDO Limited and Grant Thornton Hong Kong were also merged.

=== Ireland ===
BDO Simpson Xavier is a partnership of chartered accountants in the Republic of Ireland that was formed by Anthuan Xavier and Dave Simpson in 1982. It is the Irish member firm of BDO International. The firm adopted the worldwide branding of BDO in 2009. The rebrand took just over five months.

With offices throughout Ireland, the firm offers auditing, consultancy and tax services to organisations in the private and public sectors and is the 5th largest accountancy firm in Ireland. Revenues were €62 million for the year ending 28 February 2006, with average revenue per partner of €1.5 million.

=== India ===
BDO in India is among the largest accounting firms in India and a key member of the global BDO organisation. Headquartered in Mumbai, the firm offers services to domestic and international clients in Assurance, Tax, Advisory, Managed Services & Outsourcing, Technology Products & Solutions, and Digital Transformation. With respect to audits in India, BDO has been rapidly expanding its market share in terms of the number of companies it audits. BDO, which is ranked fifth and is placed above PwC, recorded the highest growth rate among the Big 6, jumping 30% YoY to audit 78 companies (up from 60).

Currently, BDO in India has a workforce of more than 11,000 employees, including BDO EDGE and BDO RISE, led by more than 350 partners and directors operating out of 19 offices, across 14 key cities.

=== Italy ===
BDO Italia SpA is the Italian member firm of BDO International in Italy since 1973. In 2025, BDO had 14 offices across Italy with 1,300 professionals and over 80 partners. The firm offers auditing, ESG consultancy, M&A advisory and tax and law services to organisations in the private and public sectors and is the 5th largest audit firm in Italy. Revenues were €156 million for the year ending 30 June 2025 an increase of 10% on 2024 data.

=== Mauritius ===
BDO Mauritius originates from DCDM, a firm founded in Mauritius in 1952. It is a firm of Chartered Accountants, registered with the Institute of Chartered Accountants in England and Wales. DCDM joined the BDO network in 2007 as BDO DCDM and as of 2010, became known as BDO Mauritius.

=== New Zealand ===
BDO is one of the top five Chartered Accounting and Business Advisory firms in New Zealand.

=== Puerto Rico ===
On July 10, 2019, former BDO Puerto Rico president Fernando Scherrer was indicted on federal charges related to the redirection of over $15 million in federal education funds, alongside former Puerto Rico Secretary of Education Julia Keleher and others.

BDO Puerto Rico was also retained by Puerto Rico's federal oversight board Junta de Control Fiscal to provide financial and consulting services to PREPA.

=== United Kingdom ===
BDO LLP is an accountancy and business advisory firm providing audit, tax, deals, consulting, risk, ESG, and technology services. BDO LLP is regulated by the Institute of Chartered Accountants in England and Wales (ICAEW) and the Financial Conduct Authority (FCA).

==== History ====
In November 2018, BDO and Moore Stephens announced plans to merge their UK businesses, putting BDO ahead of Grant Thornton as the fifth-largest accountancy firm in the UK. The deal was completed in February 2019.

The firm was founded in 1903 as Stoy and Co by Fred Stoy. In 1919, Jack Hayward joined the firm and it became Stoy Hayward and Co. A series of mergers with Finnie and Co in 1992 and the BDO Binder Hamlyn offices that did not join Arthur Andersen or Deloitte & Touche in 1994 created BDO Stoy Hayward, which became the UK member of BDO International. The firm became a limited liability partnership in 2004.

The names 'Stoy Hayward' were dropped in October 2009, adopting the worldwide branding of BDO.

In 2021, BDO LLP established its BDO Digital business unit, initially focusing on cyber security, technology risk, and assurance. As of July 2026, BDO Digital has expanded its information technology offering across data and analytics, artificial intelligence, cloud computing, digital transformation, and enterprise business applications. BDO Digital has formed strategic partnerships with technology vendors such as Wavenet and apsolut. As part of the network's global partnership with Microsoft, the UK firm operates within the Microsoft Partner Network.

In June 2024, BDO was globally recognised at the Partner of the Year awards, winning in three categories.

In July 2026, BDO LLP announced the completion of its merger with BDO Ireland.

==== Criticism ====
BDO Stoy Hayward was criticised for their role as administrators for the collapsed Christmas hamper savings company Farepak. BDO Stoy Hayward used an 0870 premium rate phone service to provide information for victims of Farepak's collapse in 2006. They were initially also accused by The Observer of taking a share of the call revenue to pay for the administration; this accusation was later withdrawn.

In September 2008, Andrew Caldwell, valuations partner at BDO Stoy Hayward, was appointed independent valuer for the stricken mortgage bank Northern Rock plc. The UK government nationalised Northern Rock in February 2008, and the legislation effecting the nationalisation required an independent valuer to ascertain the value of the business at the point of nationalisation. The role was a controversial one, as the legislation specified in some detail the basis of valuation, and shareholder action groups claimed that the valuation basis had been designed to minimise the compensation due.

== See also ==
- Accounting network
- Big Four accounting firms (KPMG, PwC, EY, Deloitte)
- Crowe Global
- Grant Thornton International
- Microsoft Partner Network
