= Cerre =

American fashion designer

Cerre is a Los Angeles–based womenswear and accessories brand founded in 2005 by husband and wife, Clayton and Flavie Webster. The couple met while working as fashion models in Europe. The brand was first launched as a collection of bags and leather goods, and eventually expanded into apparel in the spring of 2010. Cerre is named after Flavie Webster’s grandmother’s surname.

In 2011, Cerre opened its Melrose Avenue flagship store. The 1,600–square–foot West Hollywood store, designed by Clayton Webster, also serves as the brand’s atelier.

In 2009, Cerre collaborated with costume designer Trish Summerville to create custom leather jackets and bags for Rooney Mara’s character in The Girl with the Dragon Tattoo (2011 film), as well as costumes for Robin Wright’s character. In 2012, the designers teamed up with Summerville again to design custom pieces for the film The Hunger Games: Catching Fire.

In 2012, Cerre received the Moss Adams Fashion Innovator Award.

== Links ==
- Official website
