= The Barcud Derwen Group =

Former UK group of television facilities

The Barcud Derwen Group was an independent group of television and AV facilities in Cardiff, Wales which claimed to be the largest in the UK outside London.

== Company history ==
The original company, Barcud, was formed in 1982 by independent producers, to provide TV production facilities, originally for independent companies based in Caernarfon, Gwynedd working for S4C.

In 1992, the company merged with Derwen and created Barcud Derwen. The company then began a process of expansion. In 1990(?) the company issued shares to the public to finance the building of Studio 1 in Caernarfon.

In 2010, Barcud Derwen ran into cash-flow problems and Grant Thornton were brought into find a buyer when it was "unable at trade through its current cash-flow difficulties and should enter administration".

Barcud Derwen (traded as Arc Facilities) was successfully acquired by Creative & Technical Media Services in 2010. It only functions as media administration.

Due to the unusual size and height of the building, it was subsequently used as a large indoor climbing wall, Beacon Climbing Centre, from 2012 to present.
