= Lex Mundi =

American professional services network

- Formation: 1989
- Legal status: Legal network
- Headquarters: Houston, Texas, United States
- Region served: Worldwide
- Services: Legal Services
- Members: 150+ independent law firms
- President & CEO: Helena Samaha
- Website: www.lexmundi.com

Lex Mundi is a professional services network. It is the oldest and largest law firm network. The network was established in 1989, incorporating in Delaware.

The association was founded by Stephen McGarry of Minneapolis to help individuals and businesses obtain referrals to connect with reputable legal professionals as they seek to do business in new and unfamiliar jurisdictions. In 1990, Lex Mundi (Latin for "world law") had a network of 105 law firms and 8,000 attorneys in 47 U.S. states and territories and 51 countries.

By 1998, 140 law firms had joined the Lex Mundi network. Attorney Gary Lassen, the managing director of an affiliate law firm, told the Arizona Business Gazette that Lex Mundi was receiving more hits than any other legal-oriented website on the internet. Some affiliates have a defined territory within the network; for each American state, Canadian province, or country, there might be an exclusive Lex Mundi member firm.

In March 2019, Lex Mundi appointed Helena Samaha to succeed Carl Anduri as president, who had served in that role for the past 19 years. In May 2020, Michelle Liberman was elected chair of the company's board of directors.

As of 2022, Lex Mundi had over 150 member firms in 125 countries, totaling more than 23,000 lawyers worldwide.

Each affiliate firm is required to provide a full range of commercial legal services and be considered a "leader" in the use of technology and law firm management.

The non-profit Lex Mundi Pro Bono Foundation, a Lex Mundi affiliate, coordinates member firms who offer pro bono legal services to social entrepreneurs around the world.
