= PKF Global =

Network of accounting firms

PKF
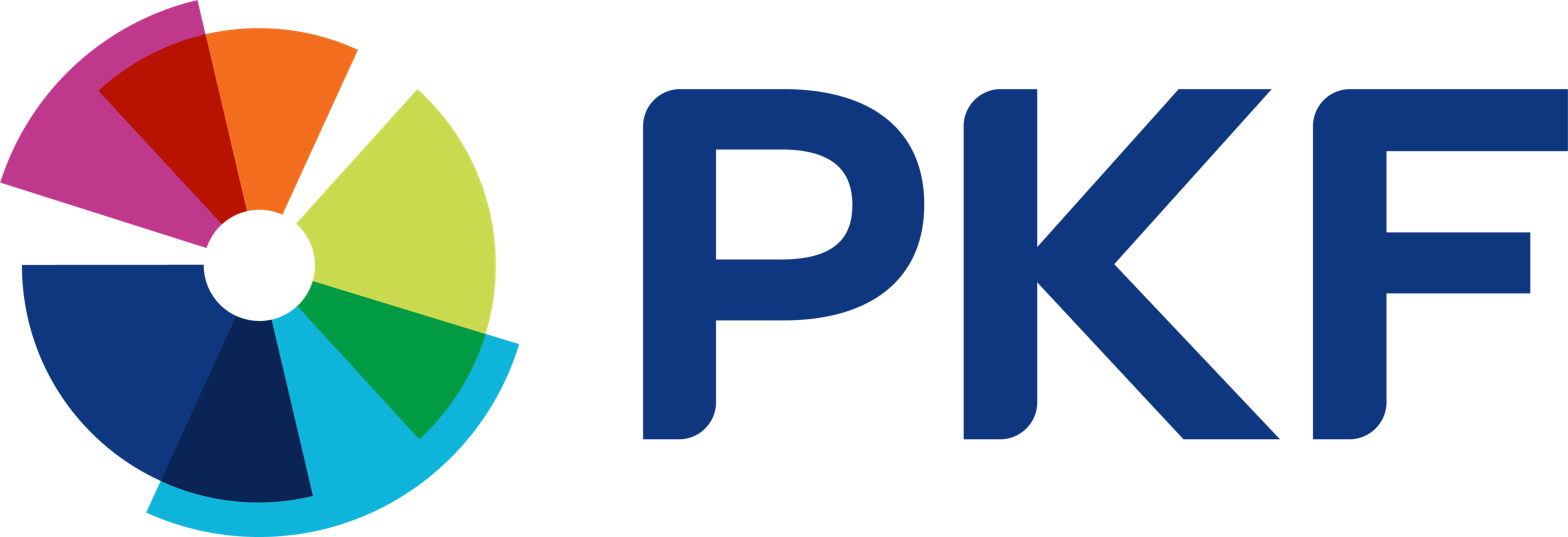
- Type: Accounting network
- Industry: Accounting
- Founded: 1969; 57 years ago
- Products: Professional services
- Website: www.pkf.com

PKF Global, formerly known as PKF International, is a network of accountancy firms. Over 214 members and 21,000 professionals operate under the PKF brand in 150 countries across five regions.

== History ==
Pannell Kerr Forster was founded in 1969 when four accountancy firms from Australia, Canada, the United Kingdom and the United States joined to create an international association. The four firms were:

- Pannell Fitzpatrick & Co, founded in 1869 by William Henry Pannell (UK);
- Harris, Kerr, Forster & Co, founded in 1911 as Harris, Kerr & Co by William Harris & Errol Kerr, and in 1923 as WJ Forster & Co by William Forster (USA);
- Campbell, Sharp, Nash & Field (Canada); and
- Wilson, Bishop, Bowes & Craig (Australia).

In 1980, member firms decided to use Pannell Kerr Forster as their common brand name to create an international accountancy brand. In 2000, member firms decided to shorten their name to PKF. Member firms are now adopting this name in their home markets, or adding PKF as a prefix to the existing firm name.

As of January 2011, over 21,000 staff were employed by PKF member firms.

2018, the PKF International network was ranked 10th in the World.
