= Meritas (law) =

American alliance of business law firms

Meritas, formerly known as Commercial Law Affiliates, is a services network consisting of a global alliance of business law firms that was founded in 1990. As of 2024, the network reported 177 member firms with about 8,600 lawyers in 91 countries. Functioning as a non-profit corporation headquartered in Minneapolis, Minnesota, Meritas operates on an invitation-only basis with its member firms requiring recertification every three years in order to maintain their membership.

== Membership ==
Jennifer McPhee, writing for Canadian Lawyer, described Meritas as one of the "more established by-invitation only legal networks that do extensive research before carefully selecting one firm per jurisdiction." Corporate Counsel Weekly also wrote, "Meritas determines significant business or economic centers where member firms' clients may need local counsel in order to determine where it will have its members," and that "...all member firms provide Meritas with quarterly referral reports, listing all Meritas-originated referrals made to and from the firm for the stated period and cooperate in evaluating specific matters." If a firm does not receive good marks, its membership with the organization may be terminated.

== Programs ==
In 2025, Meritas launched a Legal Technology Education Program to help member firms evaluate and adopt technology through online and in-person curriculum provided by top legal tech companies.

In a 2026 article published on Law.com, the organization highlighted the role of cross-border professional relationships in enabling access to local legal insight and supporting client decision-making during periods of economic and regulatory disruption. The article also noted the importance of communication across jurisdictions, diverse perspectives, and reliance on local expertise within its network.

In a August 2026 sponsored article published by Corporate Counsel, Meritas Chair Luca Citton and Legal Technology Program head Marti Phillips described the network's member firms as sharing approaches to technology and talent management across markets. They identified lawyer development, mentorship, client relationships, and business development as areas affected by firms' adoption of artificial intelligence.

== Officers ==
- May 1998: Jerome Reso (Baldwin Haspel Burke & Mayer, LLC - New Orleans, LA, USA) named as Meritas Chair
- May 2001: George Cadman (Boughton Law Corporation - Vancouver, BC, Canada) named as Chair
- May 2005: A. Lee Lundy (Tydings & Rosenberg LLP - Baltimore, Maryland, USA) named as Chair
- February 2006: Tanna Moore named President and CEO
- May 2007 Kenneth Kallish (Minden Gross LLP - Toronto, ON, Canada) named as Meritas Chair
- July 2008: Jean-Paul Bignon named as Chair-elect
- April 2009: Jean-Paul Bignon (Bignon Lebray - Paris, France) named as Chair
- May 2011: Judith Lockhart (Carter Ledyard & Milburn LLP, New York, NY) named as Chair
- May 2013: Andre Ryan (BCF LLP - Montreal, QC, Canada) named as Chair
- May 2015: Dennis Unkovic (Meyer, Unkovic & Scott - Pittsburgh, PA, United States) named as Chair
- May 2018: Jill Wiley (Waterfall Economidis - Tucson, Arizona, United States) named as Chair
- February 2020: Sona Pancholy named President
- May 2024: Luca A. Citton, president of Vancouver-based Boughton Law Corporation, was elected board chair for a three-year term
- July 2026: Jon Littlepage, CTO of Johnston Allison Hord, was named Chair of the IT Group.
