= Multidisciplinary professional services network =

Multidisciplinary professional services networks are organizations formed by law, accounting and other professional services firms to offer clients new multidisciplinary approaches solving increasingly complex issues. They are a type of professional services network which operates to provide services to their members. They operate in the same way as accounting firm networks and associations and law firm networks. They do not practice a profession such as law or accounting but provide services to members so they can serve clients needs. Their aim is to provide members involved in doing business internationally with access to experienced, tried and tested, reliable, and responsive professional advisers who know their local jurisdiction intimately as well as the intricacies of cross border business.

There are 10 multidisciplinary networks. The largest are: Alliott Group, MSI Global Alliance, Morison International, Geneva Group, International Practice Group, WSG - World Services Group and Russell Bedford International. These networks have more than 100 member firms in as many as 90 countries in hundreds of offices. The members employ thousands of professionals.

== History ==
Multidisciplinary networks are not new but found in a number of professions. They became important during the end of the 1990s when the accounting firms began to expand to the legal profession. The history is well documented.

The American Bar Association Commission on Multidisciplinary Practice refers to five multidisciplinary models. They are the cooperative, command and control, ancillary practice, network and multidisciplinary partnership models.

=== Big Six accounting firms – multidisciplinary practices ===
The multidisciplinary issues first arose in the 1940s but was dealt with by the American Bar Association prohibiting lawyers working for accounting firms to represent clients before the IRS. The foundation of multidisciplinary practice began when the Big 4 accounting firms reached their natural growth limits. Accounting, auditing and tax services could generate only a finite amount of revenue for the Big 6. The Big 4’s concept was simple: use the extensive list of clients to market non-traditional accounting services such as legal, recruitment, risk management, technology consulting, etc. The objective was to bring these non-traditional services “in-house” using the time-tested network model.

Having reached their natural limit on growth the Big 4 branched out to become multidisciplinary in legal, technology, and employment services. Since the essential infrastructure was in place, it was thought to be relatively simple to incorporate other services into the existing network. The expansion could easily be financed using revenue from the traditional services. As a network, it was natural to create independent entities in these other professions which themselves could be part of the network. The method and structures varied from firm to firm but the fundamental premise was the sharing of revenue between lawyers and accountants.

The accounting firms were initially very successful in creating these alternative businesses. Soon a number of Big 6 firms had multi-billion dollar technology consulting businesses. Other services were more difficult to bring in-house. Some, like legal services, demanded a different approach because of ethical considerations. The key factor among such different approaches is an internal control system within a firm.

=== Reaction of the legal profession ===
The initial to expand to legal services focus was on the United States which represented the largest potential market for these services. In Europe and South America the bar rules were not as developed as in the United States, and therefore did not restrict the sharing of revenues. The basis for this expansion was the law firm network that established under the umbrella of the Big Six. The issues were sharing profits with accountants and other professionals and the possible conflicts of interest.

When the Big 6 began its expansion to the legal profession, it was met with fierce opposition from law firms and bar associations. Lawyers saw that the accounting profession would subsume the legal profession with its vast resources. Commissions, panels and committees were established by legal and accounting firms to argue their positions. The American Bar Association established committees and taskforces to address the issue, but the problem spread outside of the United States, first to Europe but then to other countries where lawyers were not protected from this new foreign competition. Government agencies were enlisted. For more than five (5) years the debate escalated.

This movement ended abruptly with the fall of Arthur Andersen as a result of its association with Enron. Sarbanes–Oxley followed, which effectively ended this trend of multidisciplinary networks established by the Big 5.

=== Enron and Sarbanes–Oxley ===
There was, however, a fatal flaw in the multidisciplinary network concepts of the Big 6. The raison d’etre of the Big 6 was to audit public companies. Each service which is provided to an audited client contained an inherent conflict of interest. This conflict was illustrated by the perfect storm created by Enron. The additional services that Arthur Anderson was offering created a conflict in their role as the auditor. Multidisciplinary networks by the accounting firms were DOA. The final nail in the coffin was Sarbanes–Oxley which meant that the accounting firms had to divest their consulting practices.

== Multidisciplinary networks today ==
The multidisciplinary network model was not dead but transformed to account for the issues. If the member firms were themselves independent, there was no prohibition on having a multidisciplinary network. This was recognized by the ABA.

Today there are at least eleven networks. The largest are in the legal and accounting professions. A few of the legal and accounting networks include investment banking. The primary networks are focused on tax, employment, intellectual property, insurance and immigration.

== See also ==
- Umbrella organization
- Business networking
- Organizational studies
- Command and control
- Professional services network
- Law firm network
- Accounting networks and associations
