= Alliott Global Alliance =

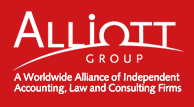
- Formerly: Alliott Peirson International (1979–1999)
- Company type: Private limited company
- Industry: Professional services
- Founded: 1979; 47 years ago
- Headquarters: London, United Kingdom
- Area served: Worldwide, 261 cities
- Key people: Darsi Casey (Worldwide Chair), Giles Brake (CEO)
- Products: Multidisciplinary professional services networks
- Services: Audit; Tax; Financial Advisory; Risk Advisory; Legal; Corporate finance
- Revenue: USD$770 million (2022)
- Members: 235
- Website: www.alliottglobal.com

Alliott Global Alliance is an alliance of independent professional services firms including accounting firms, law firms, audit firms and other specialist services providers.

The association was established in 1979 and as of 2025, comprises 235 member firms in 261 cities across 104 countries. Member firms are independent, mid-market professional practices.

== History ==
=== Origins ===
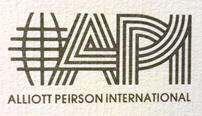
Logo of Alliott Peirson International, the forerunner to Alliott Group

The original founding firms already had working relationships and mutual clients but established a formal association in Alliott Peirson International, Alliott Global Alliance's forerunner, in 1979. The association's aim was to meet the needs more efficiently of those clients that needed assistance when expanding into or facing challenges in different jurisdictions around the world. As client demand for services in new locations grew, member firms were (and continue to be) appointed in key commercial cities across the world.

=== Multidisciplinary expansion ===
According to Inside Public Accounting, "Alliott Global Alliance was one of the first international groups to adopt an interdisciplinary approach." The association opened its membership to law firms in 2004. As a result, Alliott Global Alliance may be listed as an international law firm network or as one of a small number of Multidisciplinary professional services networks.

=== Alliott Group announces major rebrand ===
In 2020 Alliott Group rebranded and changed its company name to Alliott Global Alliance, this, accompanied by a new logo and tagline, Together as One, offers a clear and important message that transcends the personal nature of the business relationships between Alliott Global Alliance and its members.

== Rankings ==
In 2023 Alliott Global Alliance was ranked in the highest band (Band 1) of Law Firm Networks in Chambers and Partners’ ranking of Global Market Leaders for 2023.
