= Moore Global =

Global accountancy and consulting network

Moore Global Network Limited
- Company type: Global network of independent member firms
- Industry: Accounting; Professional Services; Tax; Consulting
- Founded: 1907
- Headquarters: Fourth & Fifth Floors 14-15 Lower Grosvenor Place; London, SW1W 0EX United Kingdom (International Executive Office)
- Key people: Anton Colella, Global CEO
- Products: Professional Services
- Number of employees: 30,000+ (2018)
- Website: www.moore-global.com

Logo of the network prior to its rebranding

Moore Global (officially Moore Global Network Limited) is a global accountancy, advisory and consulting network of independent firms with its headquarters in London. Moore Global is ranked by the International Accounting Bulletin (IAB) as the 12th accountancy network in the world. The Moore Global Network consists of over 37,000 people across 119 countries.

== History ==
The Moore Global network traces its origins back to a small auditing, tax consulting and insolvency practice set up by Harold Moore and Albert Partridge in 1907. Moore, Partridge & Co occupied a building not far from the Guildhall in the heart of the City of London, evolving steadily until the outbreak of war in 1914. By the end of the conflict, Albert Partridge had left and the business entered a new phase of growth.

In 1918 Harold Moore formed Moore, Stephens & Co with John Robinson Stephens, who had managed the firm while his new business partner served in the Royal Flying Corps in the First World War. The name was shortened to Moore Stephens in 1986, then evolved again when the global network rebranded as Moore in 2019.

In 1921, the firm opened an office in Glasgow and established Moore, Cross & Co. in Brazil a year later. Shortly afterwards, the firm started to develop close relations with the Greek shipping community, which continue to this day. The initial international push revolved the need to meet specific shipping client requirements. Over time, these offices diversified to offer services to a wide range of industries.

In 1968 the Moore Stephens International network was formally established and by 1979 there were member firms in most of the world's main economies.

A third generation of the Moore family, Richard, took on the task of developing the network, becoming chairman of Moore Stephens International in 2004. He stepped down at the end of 2019, having seen through the successful transition to the Moore Global network in 2019.

== Operations ==
Focused on cross-continent work with roots in local communities, and with member firms in 119 countries led by experts in several sectors, Moore Global supports clients in the following areas:

Sectors	Services
Food & Agriculture	Audit & Assurance
Media & Entertainment	Business Consultancy
Aviation	Business Restructuring & Insolvency
Financial Services	Corporate Finance
Charity & Not-for-profit	Financial Services & Wealth Management
Education	Forensic & Litigation Support
Energy, Mining & Renewables	Governance, Risk & Internal Audit
Healthcare	IT Consultancy
Leisure & Hospitality	Legal Services
Donor Funded Services	Outsourcing
Manufacturing & Distribution	Tax
Private Clients & Family Offices	Trusts & Estates
Professional Services	
Public Sector & Government	
Real Estate & Construction	
Maritime	
Technology	
Transport & Logistics	

== Leadership Programs ==
With a focus on supporting and growing leaders across the network, Moore Global executes a variety of programs available to its member firms.

=== Moore Ambition ===
With a focus on supporting the growth of young leaders, Moore Global launched Moore Ambition in 2020. With an initial intake of 147 individuals in 2020, the program has seen significant growth and enrolled 1000+ participants from across the globe to Moore Ambition 2022. Young leaders across member firms enrolled in the program attend workshops and learn key leadership skills with senior experts to inspire innovation and encourage entrepreneurship. There is a strong emphasis on international collaboration, with participants working in groups across geographic boundaries on projects with real-world applications.

=== Harvard Moore Executive Leadership Program ===
Moore Global launched a partnership with Harvard Business School to provide more experienced professionals within the Moore network a unique learning experience with Harvard's notable faculty. The programme is specifically tailored for the Moore Global Network and uses Harvard's standard-setting case study approach that focuses on the management practices of successful service firms. On completion, participants understand how to develop go-to-market strategies and create breakthrough ideas. The programme includes a 101 option, a 201 option, and a 301 option for alumni of the program.
