= Baker Tilly International =

Consulting and public accounting firm

Baker Tilly International Limited
- Type: Consulting Firm Network
- Industry: Professional services
- Founded: 1987
- Headquarters: 2 London Wall Pl, London Wall, Barbican, London, United Kingdom (global)
- Key people: Francesca Lagerberg, CEO
- Products: Artificial Intelligence; Assurance; Consulting; Environmental, social, and governance; Legal; Mergers and Acquisitions; Risk Management; Tax; Transactions
- Revenue: US$6.8 billion (2025)
- Number of employees: 50,400 (2025)
- Website: International Website

Baker Tilly also known as Baker Tilly International is an international consulting and public accounting network based in London, United Kingdom. It is currently the 6th largest CPA advisory firm in the U.S. and 9th largest accounting network in the world by revenue with 43,000 people in 700 offices across 143 territories with combined global revenues of US$5.6 billion.

Baker Tilly is composed of member firms of Baker Tilly International Limited, a UK company limited by guarantee. The network operates geographically through four regions: Asia Pacific; Europe, Middle East and Africa; Latin America; and North America. Each region has a chair, appointed by the International Board, who leads an advisory council elected by members in that region.

== History ==
Logo of Baker Tilly International until 2018

In 1987 Summit International Associates, Inc. is incorporated. The network is represented in 20 countries by 50 firms, with combined revenues of US$200m. It ranked 22nd in the world in that moment.

2000 Stephen Flesch stepped down as CEO and President of the network after 13 years in the role. Geoff Barnes, is appointed the new CEO. The network's global office moves from New York to London. In 2003 the network breaks into the top 10 of the International Accounting Bulletin World Survey (where it remains today).

In 2008 Virchow Krause, LLP, the network's largest US member firm, announced it would rebrand as Baker Tilly, LLP, taking the Baker Tilly brand into the US market place.

Baker Tilly International announced in September 2014 that the UK firm MHA Macintyre Hudson (now just known as MHA) had joined its network replacing the former UK Baker Tilly firm who had joined RSM International earlier that year.

After leading the network for 16 years, Geoff Barnes retired from the role of CEO in 2016. Baker Tilly International's Board of Directors unanimously voted EMEA regional chairman, Ted Verkade, as chief executive officer from 1 July that year

In 2019 the network unveiled a new logo, visual identity and a new slogan: 'Now, for tomorrow'. With this change, more than 90% of firms trade as Baker Tilly, strengthening the network's global presence.

In August 2020, Baker Tilly US, LLP and Squar Milner, LLP, announced to merge effective on 1 November 2020. The joint venture name is Baker Tilly US. In November 2021 Baker Tilly US announced multiple acquisitions including New York–based Margolin, Winer & Evens LLP, one of the largest regional accounting and business advisory firms in the Northeast increasing Baker Tilly's New York team to nearly 400 professionals and West Virginia-based accounting and consulting firm Arnett Carbis Toothman, LLP. The firm also announced that it would enter Boston with the acquisition of The MFA Companies and acquire California-based The Compliance Group. In May 2022 Baker Tilly US announced the acquisition of Seattle-based accounting firm Bader Martin, in August local government consulting firm Management Partners and in September tax consultancy firm True Partners Consulting.

In December 2021 top 50 UK law firm Freeths became the first stand-alone legal practice in Europe to join Baker Tilly International continuing the global network's expansion into commercial law. As a full-service law firm, Freeths' 12 UK offices and team of 600+ lawyers provides advice to businesses in areas such as mergers and acquisitions, business immigration, environmental law, dispute management, insolvency and competition policy.

In September 2022 Baker Tilly Spain announced details of a merger with the M&A, ESG and Real estate advisory services firm AddVANTE. The newly combined entity will rank among the top 12 business advisory firms in Spain, with a team of more than 375 professionals across 10 offices.

On 16 March 2022, Baker Tilly International announced that it was separating member firms in Russia and Belarus from its global network saying that "this decision is a direct consequence of the actions of these governments, and not the individuals of these countries."

On 1 June 2022, Baker Tilly International announced the appointment of Francesca Lagerberg as their new CEO. She is the first British woman to be the global CEO of a top 10 accounting firm or network. She regular appears in the media talking about accounting sector and industry issues.

In February 2023 Baker Tilly International announced revenues of $4.66bn reflecting a 13% increase in constant currency terms on the last financial year. In North America revenues topped $2bn and in Asia Pacific $1bn for the first time.

In 2023 Baker Tilly's UK member firm MHA announced several mergers with smaller firms in Wales, the North West of England and Scotland.

In February 2024 Baker Tilly International announced revenues of $5.17bn with growth across all regions and service lines.

In February 2024 they also announced the sale of majority stake to private equity firms Hellman & Friedman (H&F) and Valeas Capital Partners. As part of the transaction, Baker Tilly stated plans to adopt an alternative practice structure. Jeff Ferro, the firm's CEO, was named chief executive officer of Baker Tilly Advisory Group LP, which would include the firm's advisory, tax, and consulting services. Jere Shawver, then managing partner for risk and assurance, was appointed CEO of Baker Tilly US LLP, the licensed CPA firm responsible for attest services.

In April 2025 Baker Tilly agreed to merge with Moss Adams in a transaction valued at approximately $7 billion, aiming to become the sixth-largest U.S. CPA advisory firm.

== Baker Tilly US ==
Baker Tilly US, LLP (doing business as Baker Tilly) is a public accounting and consulting firm headquartered in Chicago, Illinois. Formerly known as Virchow, Krause & Company, LLP, the firm is the American member of Baker Tilly International. Having joined Baker Tilly International in 1999, the firm officially adopted the Baker Tilly name on June 1, 2009. Vault Accounting 50 has ranked Baker Tilly Virchow Krause, LLP as the 8th most prestigious accounting firm in their 2019 ranking.

The US branch of the firm originated in 1931 and the present partnership was organized in 1953.

On June 1, 2009, the former Virchow, Krause & Company, LLP changed its name to Baker Tilly Virchow Krause, LLP, becoming the only U.S. member of the Baker Tilly International network to be branded as "Baker Tilly".

Baker Tilly Virchow Krause, LLP merged with Philadelphia-based ParenteBeard, LLC effective October 1, 2014.

On September 20, 2021, Baker Tilly, US, LLP acquired Charleston, WV based accounting and consulting firm Arnett Carbis Toothman. Baker Tilly US, LLP merged with the California-based accounting firm Squar Milner and acquired the New York–based firm Margolin, Winer & Evens effective November 1, 2020. It was also announced on November 3, 2021, that Baker Tilly, US, LLP is acquiring The MFA Companies, a Boston-based financial services and consulting firm.
