= Anton Colella =

Scottish businessman

- Born: Glasgow, Scotland
- Education: University of Stirling
- Occupation: Businessman
- Years active: 2003–present
- Title: CEO of Moore Global

Anton Colella is a Scottish businessman. He has been the chief executive officer of Moore Global since 2018, and was previously the global chief executive of the Institute of Chartered Accountants of Scotland. Colella is an advocate for value-driven business practices and accounting ethics.

== Early life and education ==
Anton Colella was raised in Shettleston in a single parent family. He graduated from the University of Stirling.

== Teaching career ==
Colella spent the first 18 years of his career as a Catholic theology teacher. He served as deputy headmaster at St Margaret Mary's Secondary School in Glasgow from 2000 to 2003.

== Business career ==
In 2003, Colella became the chief executive of the Scottish Qualification Authority (SQA). In October 2006, he became the chief executive of the Institute of Chartered Accountants of Scotland (ICAS). This appointment was made despite the fact that Colella did not possess an MBA degree, nor any obvious qualifications apart from his work in Catholic education.

Colella oversaw a globalization phase of ICAS, such that, by 2015, he claimed that their overseas membership had grown by 60 per cent in the previous decade. During this period, Colella also advocated for the simplification of the UK tax code, which he complained of being "12 times the length of the Bible". Colella departed the ICAS in March 2018. At his resignation, the ICAS president Brian Souter said, "Over the past decade, Anton has been the architect of a transformed ICAS".

Colella became the CEO of Moore Global in March 2018. Colella oversaw the rebranding of the company from Moore Stephens to Moore Global. Colella defended the rebranding as meeting "a world defined by global decision-making, data-driven insight and the need for agility."

In 2025, Colella launched Leading Life with Anton Colella, a new monthly leadership series on his LinkedIn. The series explores universal themes — from finding purpose to aligning values and leading with humility — offering Colella's perspective on how leadership can bring fulfilment in work, life, and community.

== Affiliations ==
In 2011, Colella became a chair of the Global Accounting Alliance.

Colella serves on the International Executive Council of the Sword of the Spirit, an association of Christian communities belonging to the charismatic movement.

Colella also serves on the International Board of Directors of school feeding charity Mary's Meals.
