= Moss Adams =

American accounting firm

Moss Adams LLP
- Type: Limited Liability Partnership
- Industry: Professional Services; Consulting
- Founded: 1913; 113 years ago
- Defunct: June 2025; 13 months ago
- Fate: Combined operations with and began operating as Baker Tilly
- Successor: Baker Tilly
- Area served: Washington; Oregon; California; Arizona; New Mexico; Kansas; Colorado; Texas; Utah
- Services: Audit Assurance Tax advisory Consulting Risk management IT risk management M&A advisory Valuation ESG and sustainability consulting

Moss Adams LLP was one of the largest (Accounting Today Top 100 Firms 2019) public accounting firms in the United States and provided accounting, tax, and consulting services to public and private middle-market enterprises in many different industries.

On June 3, 2025, the company completed the combination of its operations with those of Baker Tilly, and began operating as a new entity under the latter's name. The combination created the sixth-largest advisory CPA firm in the US.

Pre-Merger	Post-Merger
~3,800 employees	~11,500 employees
Over 30 US locations	Over 100 US locations
Revenue: ~$1.72 billion (2024)	Revenue: more than $3 billion (2024)

== History ==
Founded in 1913 by John G. McIntosh, the firm first offered accounting services to the forest products industry in the Pacific Northwest. In 1922, the firm expanded services to Portland.

In the 1960s, Moss Adams added offices in Washington, Oregon, and California. In 1972, the firm added a consulting arm to complement assurance and tax services.

Moss Adams marked 100 years of serving clients in 2013, released reports of the firm’s progress over the past 100 years, and announced goals toward social and environmental progress.

Moss Adams combined with Baker Tilly on June 3, 2025, and operates as Baker Tilly. The new firm is the sixth-largest U.S. CPA advisory firm.

== Mergers and acquisitions ==
Moss Adams made several strategic mergers from 2010–2025 that expanded the firm’s services and geographical reach.

Combinations completed shortly before the Baker Tilly merger include:

- Yurgosky Consulting (2024), bringing the firm into the Salesforce consulting space
- 360 Cloud Solutions (2025), expanding its NetSuite implementation services

=== Merger with Baker Tilly (2025) ===
The Moss Adams and Baker Tilly merger value was approximately U.S. $7 billion, as reported by the Wall Street Journal, creating the sixth-largest U.S. advisory and accounting firm by revenue.

The merged firm operates as two entities under the Baker Tilly name: Baker Tilly US, LLP and Baker Tilly Advisory Group, LP. Moss Adams CEO Eric Miles succeeded Baker Tilly CEO Jeff Ferro on January 1, 2026.

The merger was also backed by private-equity investment: Hellman & Friedman (an existing investor in Baker Tilly) and Valeas Capital Partners both increased their stakes as part of the transaction.

The combined firm projects growth up to $6 billion by 2030, up from more than $3 billion in 2024.

== Services and industries ==
Moss Adams offered financial advisory services to public and private middle market enterprises across three broad categories: accounting, tax, and consulting. It also offered wealth management services, including investment banking and asset management, through its affiliated companies, Moss Adams Capital LLC and Moss Adams Wealth Advisors LLC.

Accounting services included an assurance practice that provided financial audits, and technical accounting, public company, contract compliance, business owner transaction, IPO, and environmental, social, and governance (ESG) services.

Tax services included ASC 740 income tax accounting, compensation and benefits, controversy and dispute resolution, credits and incentives, international taxes, personal taxes, and state and local taxes.

Consulting services covered a range of disciplines including technology and risk, IT compliance, strategy and operations, support for transactions, and industry-specific advisories for health care, financial services, and telecommunications.

The firm served clients in more than 30 industries including manufacturing, real estate, technology, and health care.

== Culture and corporate responsibility ==
Moss Adams has been outspoken about their culture regarding corporate responsibility, especially as it relates to environmental, social, and governance principles.

The Moss Adams Foundation, an independent not-for-profit organization, offers grantmaking funding for programs related to equity, education, and the environment. It also offers incentive programs to Moss Adams employees by providing paid volunteer time off to encourage giving back to the community as well as matching donations to eligible charitable organizations.

Moss Adams has been recognized for their commitment to inclusion and diversity, support for women in the workplace, and working mothers, and other corporate responsibility efforts.

Moss Adams has been named to four Forbes lists:

- America’s Best Midsize Employers (2025)
- America’s Best Tax and Accounting Firms (2023)
- Best Employers for Women (2018)
- Best Employers for Diversity (2018)

=== Rankings and recognition ===
Moss Adams was regularly listed among the top accounting firms in the U.S. by Accounting Today. It also appeared on the Inside Public Accounting (IPA) Top 100 list.

According to CPA Practice Advisor, Vault’s 2025 “50 Most Prestigious Accounting Firms” included Moss Adams at #11.

In the 2024 Vault Accounting 25 ranking, Moss Adams was ranked #6.

== Affiliations and international network ==
For more than 70 years, Moss Adams served international clients. Prior to its merger with Baker Tilly, Moss Adams was a founding member of Praxity, a global alliance of independent accounting and auditing companies that allowed the firm to serve clients in 120 countries.

As part of the Baker Tilly International consulting and public accounting network, it has access to 43,000 professionals to provide services to clients in 143 territories.
