= Pacific Rim Advisory Council =

- Abbreviation: PRAC
- Formation: 1984
- Website: www.prac.org

The Pacific Rim Advisory Council (PRAC) is an international law firm association for the exchange of professional information among its 30 independent member law firms. The PRAC was founded in 1984 to examine legal and business issues in Asia and the broader Pacific Rim region.
