= Accounting network =

Organisations that provide accounting services

An accounting network or accounting association is a professional services network whose principal purpose is to provide members resources to assist the clients around the world and hence reduce the uncertainty by bringing together a greater number of resources to work on a problem. The networks and associations operate independently of the independent members. The largest accounting networks are known as the Big Four.

== The Big Four ==
Logos of the Big Four.

The Big Four are the four largest professional services networks in the world: Deloitte, EY, KPMG, and PwC. The four are grouped because of their large sizes relative to their competitors, both in terms of revenue and workforce headcount; they are likewise considered comparable in their ability to provide consistent and reliable professional services to their clients. Colloquially, their networks are considered of parity to those seeking careers in the services offered by these firms because of the frequency with which they engage with Fortune 500 companies.

The Big Four offer audit, assurance, taxation, management consulting, valuation, market research, actuarial, corporate finance, and legal services to their clients. A significant majority of the audits of public companies, as well as many audits of private companies, are conducted by these four networks. Until the late 20th century, the market for these professional services was dominated by eight firms, which were accordingly nicknamed the Big Eight. The Big Eight consisted of Arthur Andersen, Arthur Young, Coopers & Lybrand, Deloitte Haskins and Sells, Ernst & Whinney, Peat Marwick Mitchell, Price Waterhouse, and Touche Ross.

The Big Eight gradually evolved into the Big Four due to mergers between some of these firms, and culminated in the 2002 collapse of Arthur Andersen, leaving four networks dominating the market at the turn of the 21st century. In the United Kingdom in 2011, it was reported that the Big Four account for the audits of 99% of the companies in the FTSE 100 Index, and 96% of the companies in the FTSE 250 Index, an index of the leading mid-cap listing companies. This high level of industry concentration has caused concern among critics, and is the chief reason some notable people of business have expressed the desire for government bodies such as the UK's Competition & Markets Authority (CMA) to consider breaking up the Big Four.

== History of accounting networks and associations ==
=== Foundations ===
Accounting networks were created to meet a specific need. “The accounting profession in the U.S. was built upon a state-established monopoly for audits of financial statements.” Accounting networks arose out of the necessity for public American companies to have audited financial statements for the Securities and Exchange Commission (SEC). For over 70 years, the SEC has continually sought for greater coordination and consistent quality in audits everywhere in the world. Networks were the logical model to address these requirements. They expanded outside of the United States since financial results had to be audited wherever a company conducted business. In the US, the Public Company Accounting Oversight Board's (PCAOB) regulations provide for inspection of non-United States firms. Without a network with common standards and internal means of communications, conducting the required audits would not be possible.

There were other profession-based factors which favored the growth of accounting networks. As a result of competition for the audit work, consolidation was inevitable. These include the fact that a network can establish a brand. A brand establishes the credibility of the network and allows the individual members to charge more. Creating a brand is very difficult when all of the members of a network are providing essentially the same services.

Being a network member establishes that the firm is part of a large group. Additionally, the larger the firm, the more likely it will be invited to render auditing engagements. A large organized network allows for spreading the costs to price competitively. Ultimately, size is the only real means of differentiation that is readily available on accounting firms to assure clients that they can do international work.

Networks also reflect the clients’ needs for seamless worldwide services because they are more efficient and cost-effective. From the perspective of the accounting firm, a global regulated organization with consistently applied standards significantly reduced the risk. However, increasing the size of the networks can enhance legal liability risks and quality control issues that have not been resolved.

With these factors in play, some networks continued to grow; others remained in a stasis position. Individual members of networks began to offer other services related to accounting. These services included forensic accounting, business appraisals, employee benefits planning, strategic planning, and almost anything associated with financial parts of the client’s business. The network’s structure easily accommodated these services and their geographical expansion.

As the Big Eight consolidated to become Big Six, the Big Five and then the Big Four, new networks naturally developed to emulate them. BDO and Grant Thornton were the earliest followers. Networks were then developed to serve mid-market companies and private businesses. New networks also sprang up as an extension of a single accounting firm in the same way the Big Eight were formed. New structures were created to further extend the networks.

The largest accounting networks adopted trade names that each member used. The names of the original firms that became part of the networks were lost and replaced with trade names. The perception was created that these networks were more than networks, but single entities rather than completely independent firms. This was never the case. The result was that the Big Eight concept was established which separated the eight firms from all other accounting firms.

Another factor in the development of networks in accounting was the American Institute of Certified Public Accountants (AICPA)’s prohibition of advertising. While the largest firms indirectly advertised their services, the small firms complied with the rules and believed advertising to be unprofessional. Additionally, midsize firms were de facto restricted from advertising simply because of limited budgets. They could not create a brand that was able to compete with the one established by the Big Eight. The advertising restriction was lifted in the 1970s by the Federal Trade Commission.

=== Multidisciplinary expansion ===
In the 1990s, the large accounting firms reached another ceiling in the services they made available to their clients. Having reached their natural limit on growth with more than 90% of auditing for public companies, the Big 6 branched out to become multidisciplinary in legal, technology, and employment services. Since the essential infrastructure was in place, it was thought to be relatively simple to incorporate other services into the existing network. As a network, it was natural to create independent entities in these other professions which themselves could be part of the network. The method and structures varied from firm to firm.

When the Big 6 began its expansion to the legal profession, it was met with fierce opposition from law firms and bar associations. Commissions, panels and committees were established by legal and accounting firms to argue their positions. Government agencies were enlisted. For more than five years the debate escalated. This movement ended abruptly with the fall of Arthur Andersen as a result of its association with Enron. Sarbanes–Oxley followed, which effectively ended this trend. Some international associations of independent firms, such as Alliott Group, now include law firms within the membership.

=== Global ranking ===
Here is the list of the largest global accounting networks based on full year 2023 revenue (if available):

Global Accountancy Top 9
No.	Firms	Headquarters	Revenue (USD)	Change
1	Deloitte	United Kingdom	$64.9 billion (2023)	Steady
2	PwC	United Kingdom	$53.1 billion (2023)	Steady
3	EY	United Kingdom	$49.4 billion (2023)	Steady
4	KPMG	United Kingdom	$36.4 billion (2023)	Steady
5	BDO	Belgium	$14.0 billion (2023)	Steady
6	RSM	United Kingdom	$9.4 billion (2023)	Steady
7	Grant Thornton	United Kingdom	$7.5 billion (2023)	Steady
8	Crowe	United States	$5.3 billion (2023)	▲
9	Baker Tilly	United Kingdom	$5.2 billion (2023)	▼

== Vicarious liability ==
Accounting networks are adapting their operating models to address vicarious liability risks and clarify their legal structures. Historically, many global accounting networks marketed themselves as unified entities; however, recent legal rulings have prompted these firms to distinguish between the global brand and the independent, locally incorporated member firms that actually deliver service.

Although accounting networks have been unsuccessful in several legal disputes, specific factual circumstances or procedural elements have mitigated their ultimate financial or legal liability.

== Networks versus associations ==
The vicarious liability issues carry over into operations. Regulations in the EU have been imposed that require the “networks” to define whether they are "associations" of independent firm or are more integrated networks operationally and financially. Additional standards have been passed by the International Federation of Accountants, an independent organization representing the accounting industry, on distinguishing networks from associations. The objectives of each are to provide the clients a level of understanding about the degree of integration with each other. Examples of international associations of accounting firms include Alliott Group, GGI Global Alliance and Leading Edge Alliance.

Here is the list of top 10 global accounting associations in 2021:

Global Accountancy Associations Top 10

No.	Association	2021 Revenue ($b)	2019 Revenue ($b)
1.	Praxity	6.96	5.83
2.	GGI	6.15	5.63
3.	TAG Alliances	4.77	4.74
4.	Allinial Global	4.18	4.18
5.	PrimeGlobal	3.51	2.64
6.	IAPA International	2.70	2.70
7.	LEA Global/Leading Alliances	2.10	3.42
8.	MSI Global Alliance	1.60	1.45
9.	BKR International	1.52	1.40
10.	DFK International	1.49	1.30

== Conflicts of interest ==
Self-definition as a network or associations may determine if there is a conflict of interest. If the group is perceived as a network, it may be foreclosed from representation of clients because they cannot represent a competitor. Association members would not be foreclosed from representation because the firms are perceived as independent by clients.

== Big 4 dominance of public company audits ==
Accounting scandals have again focused on the fact that the Big Four has a near monopoly on audits of public companies. Networks are demanding regulations on auditing to require that auditors rotate and include the smaller networks in this rotation. The demands also request that mid-market firms be able to participate to break up the monopoly of the Big Four.

== List of accounting networks and associations ==
- (United States) Andersen Global
- (United Kingdom) Alliott Group
- (United Kingdom) Baker Tilly
- (Belgium) BDO International (Binder Dijker Otte & Co)
- (United States) Crowe Global
- (United Kingdom) Deloitte (Deloitte Haskins Sells/Deloitte, Haskins Sells, Touche Ross, Tohmatsu)
- (United Kingdom) Ernst & Young (Arthur Young, Ernst Whinney/Ernst Ernst, Whinney Smith Murray)
- (United Kingdom) Grant Thornton International
- (United Kingdom) HLB International
- (United Kingdom) Integra International Ltd
- (United Kingdom) (Netherlands) KPMG (Klynveld Main Goerdeler, Peat Marwick)
- (France) Forvis Mazars
- (Canada) MNP LLP
- (United Kingdom) Morison KSi
- (United Kingdom) Moore Global
- (Australia) (Canada) (United Kingdom) (United States) PKF International
- (United Kingdom) PwC (PricewaterhouseCoopers, Coopers & Lybrand/Cooper Brothers, Lybrand Ross Brothers Montgomery, Price Waterhouse)
- (United Kingdom) (United States) RSM International
- (China) (Hong Kong) SW International
- (Argentina) (Brazil) (Mexico) (United States) SMS Latinoamerica
- (United Kingdom) SGA World
- (Netherlands) WTS Global
- (United States) Plante Moran

== See also ==
- Umbrella organization
- Business networking
- Organization studies
- Multidisciplinary professional services networks
- Law firm network
- Big Four accounting firms
