= Law firm network =

Organisation of independent law firms

A law firm network (law firm association or legal network) is a membership organization consisting of independent law firms. These networks are one type of professional services networks similar to networks found in the accounting profession. The common purpose is to expand the resources available to each member for providing services to their clients. Prominent primary law firm networks include CICERO League of International Lawyers, First Law International, Alliott Group (multidisciplinary), Lex Mundi, World Services Group (multidisciplinary), TerraLex, Meritas, Multilaw, The Network of Trial Law Firms, Inc., the State Capital Group, and Pacific Rim Advisory Council. Some of the largest legal networks span the globe, boasting over 10,000 attorneys spread across hundreds of offices worldwide.

Firms within a network can have formal or informal connections with each other, depending on the network's purpose.

== History of law firm networks ==
Growth of networks based upon published directories of networks and associations

There are two different reasons for networks developing in the legal profession. The first reason is that law firms needed international connections due to globalization in the 1990s. The second reason is the expansion of many large United States firms to become "national". Smaller firms or firms with a niche practice requested expertise from these networks.

The internationalization of the legal profession began later than that of the accounting profession. Unlike accounting firms that conducted worldwide audits, law firms in each country were able to deal with national client matters. This changed in 1949, when Baker & McKenzie began to expand to non-United States markets to assist U.S. clients that were expanding overseas following WWII.

Internationalization was slow because the legal profession was more restrictive than accounting in allowing foreign firms to enter and practice in other countries. One of the requirements is that the names of the partners should be present in the name of the firm.

In the late 1980s, U.S. and English firms began establishing branches in the primary commercial centers. This new competition in local markets had the immediate effect of forcing local firms to evaluate alternative ways of providing services to their international clients.

The first international networks, called clubs, generally consisted of ten firms in different countries. The typical format was to hold several meetings a year among managing partners, to compare notes on management-related issues. They were secretive networks because the members feared losing business from other firms. On the other hand, they would advertise to their clients that they had foreign connections and correspondents. Today the clubs are commonly known as "best friends networks". Examples today are Leading Counsel Network and Slaughter & May.

The clubs evolved into networks in the 1980s. The networks were not secretive and published directories, materials, and brochures (Interlaw being one of the first examples). The members met annually. Some focused on specific practices, such as litigation, while others were more generic. Because networks were not thought of as strategic models, the membership selection process was not rigorous. This selection process is reflected today in the networks that have firms with a wide range of sizes, i.e., small firms in locations where there are firms three and four times the size of the country.

Lex Mundi was formed in 1989. It was the first network where each member had to be among the largest and most established firms in a state or country. It was a business that provided members with many alternatives to expand their resources. Lex Mundi is a network organized around strategic objectives, rather than objectives being defined after the network was established. While different from the accounting network, the concept was that of an entity that provided services to members and should also have an established brand. The staff, board, councils, and members collaborated to achieve the objectives.

Other networks like TerraLex, Meritas also known as the Commercial Law Affiliates and International Jurists, soon followed. These networks operated as businesses. Their stated objective was to create a branded alternative to the large United States and English law firms that had expanded into their countries.

In the 1980s, the United States witnessed the development of specialized national networks. One example of such a network focused on insurance litigation was ALFA. The State Capital Law Firm Group also emerged in the 1980s, initially as a national network for firms specializing in government affairs. Membership in this network reportedly required a former governor to be affiliated with the firm. Notably, both ALFA and the State Capital Law Firm Group later expanded internationally, becoming ALFA International and the State Capital Global Legal Network, respectively.

Largest legal networks, 2011
Network	Attorneys	Jurisdictions	Offices	Members	Founded
Lex Mundi	21,000	160	560	160	1989
World Services Group	19,232	141	387	150	2003
First Law International (FLI)	18,000	100	80	70	2001
TerraLex	15,000	155	300	155	1991
State Capital Group	11,717	140	447	148	1989
World Law Group	10,500	65	250	47	1988
Pacific Rim Advisory Council	10,000	—	—	32	—
ALFA International	9,000	110	200	132	1980
TAGLaw	7,900	150	320	150	1999
Meritas	7,140	135	237	173	1990
InterLex	6,000	134	254	134	1991
US Law Network	5,800	—	—	101	—
USA Law Firm Group	5,600	39	125	19	1990
ADVOC	5,500	110	150	90	—
Morison International	5,237	—	395	86	—
Eurojuris International	5,000	40	650	630	1989
InterLaw	5,000	70	120	70	1984

== Management structure ==
The typical network is run on a day-to-day basis by an administrative office called a secretariat or home office.

The head office is commonly located in major commercial centers in Europe or North America and does not practice law. Depending on the nature of the network (extension of the members or an independent business), the person responsible for the network will be an executive director or president/CEO.

The network may be governed by a board of directors. Networks also have representatives who form a management board with the executive director.

== Membership ==
There are three different types of networks. The original large networks – Lex Mundi, ALFA, TerraLex, and State Capital Group – tended to members who were large firms. This was because they were competing against large firms opening offices. Newer networks are more likely to include smaller firms. Specialty law firms may participate in boutique networks based on their field of law.

Law firm networks may offer their members territorial exclusivity. When that occurs, another firm can not be admitted within its exclusive territory.

Network members may together have hundreds of offices. Firms listed in the list of largest U.S. law firms have at most 4,000 attorneys. The largest networks include more than 10,000 attorneys.

Membership of networks may be open to accounting firms, and accounting networks also form alliances with law networks. Some commentators take the position that bringing together a group of lawyers and accountants to create a multidisciplinary association ultimately benefits clients as they often need a wide range of professional services advisors when involved in large transactions, for example, when incorporating a new business or in litigation matters, when for lawyers, the litigation support services of accountants can be very valuable. Bringing lawyers and accountants together does not create a multidisciplinary practice (MDP), as all firms are separate legal entities. MDPs that involve law firms partnering with non-law firms remain highly regulated or forbidden in most nations and jurisdictions.

== Functions ==
=== Retaining firm independence ===
Becoming part of a network may help firms serve new marketplaces while retaining independence, creating economies of scale, and pool resources.

=== Client retention ===
Networks allow firms to refer their clients to similar-sized members in another jurisdiction, rather than lose clients to a larger international firm. Many firms believe that being part of a network provides clients with reassurance that they will receive similar levels of service from any firm in the network

=== Practice development ===
Networks allow firms to attract larger clients operating on a multi-jurisdictional basis. Others disagree that law firm networks offer practice development opportunities.

=== Advantages of exclusivity ===
Networks may offer firms exclusivity. This may be a city, state, or country.

=== Branding ===
Membership in a network gives members the right to promote their affiliation in its territory using the network's logo. Use of the brand is encouraged, but not usually required, and would typically be implemented across firm stationery, marketing brochures, and web pages.

=== Open discussion in a non-competitive environment ===
Many networks consist of non-competing firms and therefore provide their members with the opportunity to openly discuss issues affecting their firm.

== See also ==
- Bar association
- Umbrella organization
- Business networking
- Professional services networks
- Multidisciplinary professional services networks
- Accounting networks and associations
