= World Services Group =

Business professional services network

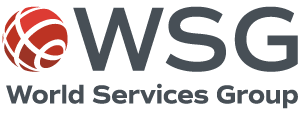
- Industry: Global legal network integrated with investment banking and accounting services
- Founded: 2002
- Headquarters: Houston, Texas, U.S.
- Area served: Global
- Key people: Herman H. Raspé (Chairman); Maricarmen Trujillo (Chief Operating Officer)
- Services: Multidisciplinary Network; Legal; Investment banking Accounting
- Website: worldservicesgroup.com

World Services Group (WSG) is a global multidisciplinary professional services network composed of independent law, accounting, and investment banking firms. It ranks as one of the largest among the more than 200 professional service networks in the world. WSG members are independent law, accounting, and investment banking firms. According to the organization's website as of 2021, WSG was formed in 2002 as a multidisciplinary network comprising over 120 member firms in 150 jurisdictions and 23,000 professionals. Its global headquarters are located in Houston, Texas.

== Governance ==
WSG is a global professional services network of independent firms that represent their own individual clients. In WSG, like most of these organizations, member firms are highly vetted and are required to be top-tier firms. WSG is governed by a board of directors consisting of representatives from each region and from the various services that the members provide. WSG operates and is managed by staff out of Houston, Texas.

=== Officers ===
- Rafael Calvo Salinero, Garrigues - Chair
- Raimondo Premonte, Gianni & Origoni - Chair Elect
- Carolina Serra, Beccar Varela - Secretary
- Machiuanna Chu, Deacons - Treasurer
- André Vautour, Lavery Lawyers - Chair Emeritus
- Maricarmen Trujillo, World Services Group - Chief Operating Officer

=== Directors ===
The directors are representative of their industry and regions.

- Charbel Abi-Antoun, Beirut Law Firm (Legal - Lebanon)
- Isaac Fenyane, ENS (Legal - South Africa)
- Leonardo Loo, Quarles & Brady LLP (Legal - AZ, USA)
- J. Robison, Bradley Arant Boult Cummings LLP (Legal - AL, USA)
- Jaime Robledo Vasquez, Brigard Urrutia (Legal - Colombia)
- Mathias Schroeder, LL.M., Heuking (Legal - Germany)
- Ricardo Garcia-Moreno, Haynes and Boone, LLP (Legal - TX, USA)
- Pei Ching Ong, TSMP Law Corporation (Legal - Singapore)
- Diego Martin, Consortium Legal - El Salvador (Legal - El Salvador)

== Global structure ==
WSG is divided into six regions: Africa and the Middle East, Asia Pacific, the Caribbean, Europe, Latin America, and North America. Each region has a regional council consisting of five WSG member representatives. All WSG members are recognized as leading independent firms in their region by the top ranking publications and awards, including Chambers and Partners, Super Lawyers, Best Lawyers, Legal 500, International Financial Law Review 1000, and other rating organizations.

== See also ==
- Umbrella organization
- Business networking
- Organizational Studies
- Professional services networks
