= Crowe Global =

Multinational professional services network

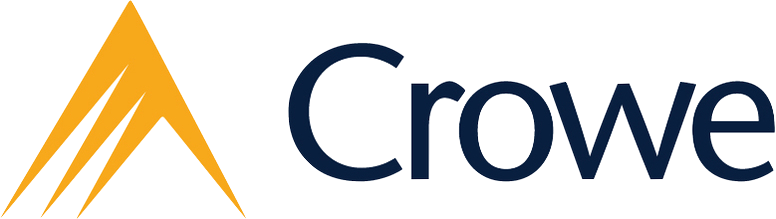
- Type: Swiss Verein
- Industry: Professional services
- Founded: 1915 (Horwath & Horwath); 1960 (Horwath & Horwath International); 1991 (merger of Crowe LLP, firm changed name to Crowe Horwath in 2009); 2018 (Crowe)
- Founder: Fred P. Crowe Sr.; Ernest Horwath; Edmund Horwath
- Headquarters: New York, United States
- Area served: Worldwide
- Key people: Kamel Abouchacra (CEO); Jim Powers (chairman of global board)
- Services: Audit; Tax; Management consulting; Financial advisory; Risk advisory
- Revenue: ▲US$6.5 billion (2025)
- Website: www.crowe.com/global

Crowe is a multinational professional services network, headquartered in New York, United States. It is the 9th largest global accounting network in the world by revenue. The Crowe network is composed of member firms of Crowe Global (previously Crowe Horwath International) a Swiss Verein registered in Zurich, Switzerland.

Crowe provides audit, tax, consulting, enterprise risk and financial advisory services. In FY 2025, the network earned a $6.5 billion in aggregate revenues.

== History ==
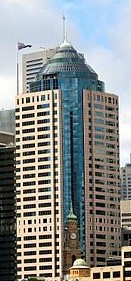
Crowe offices in Sydney, Australia at 1 O'Connell Street (right)

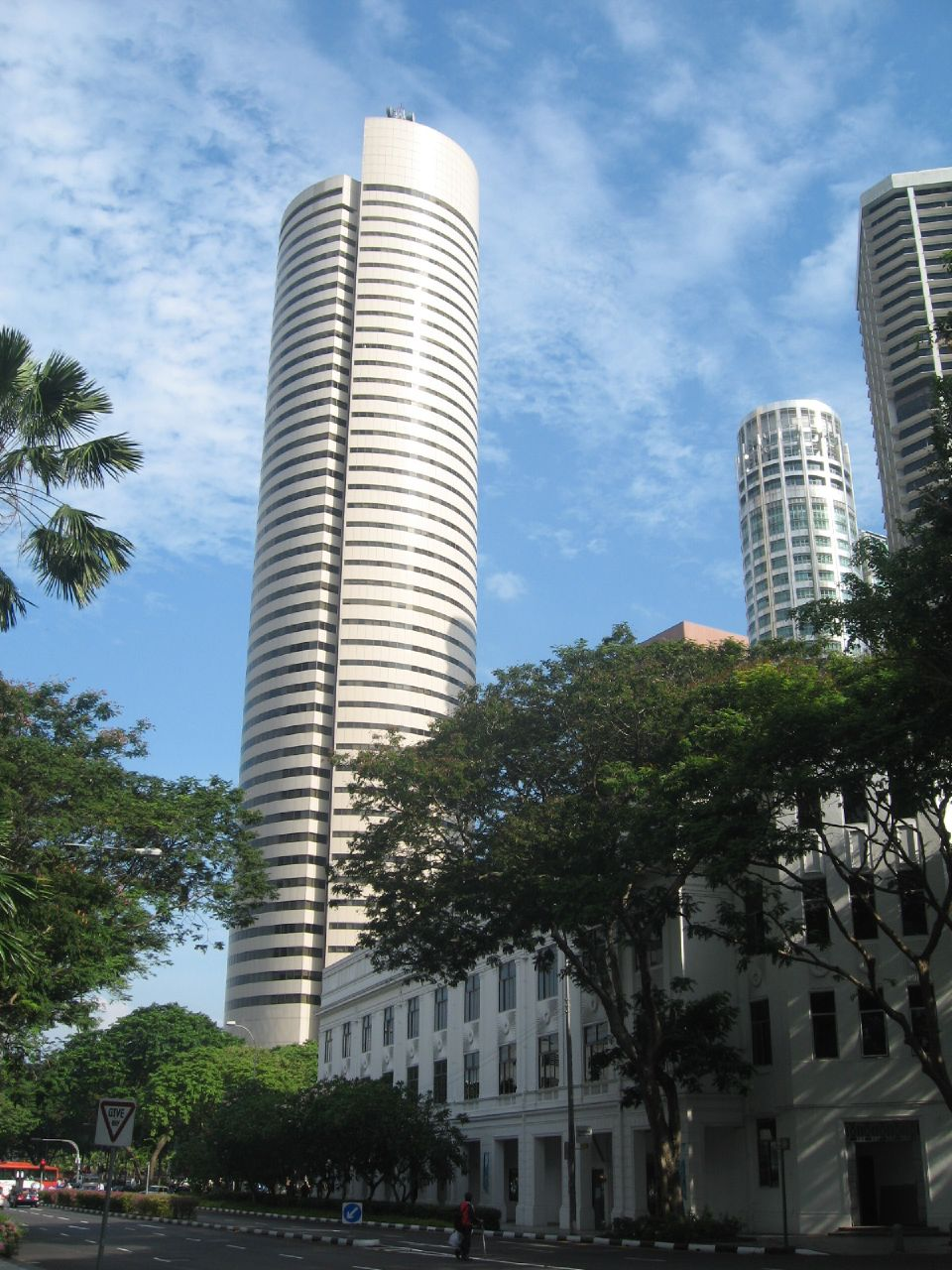
Crowe's Singapore offices at 8 Shenton Way, Singapore

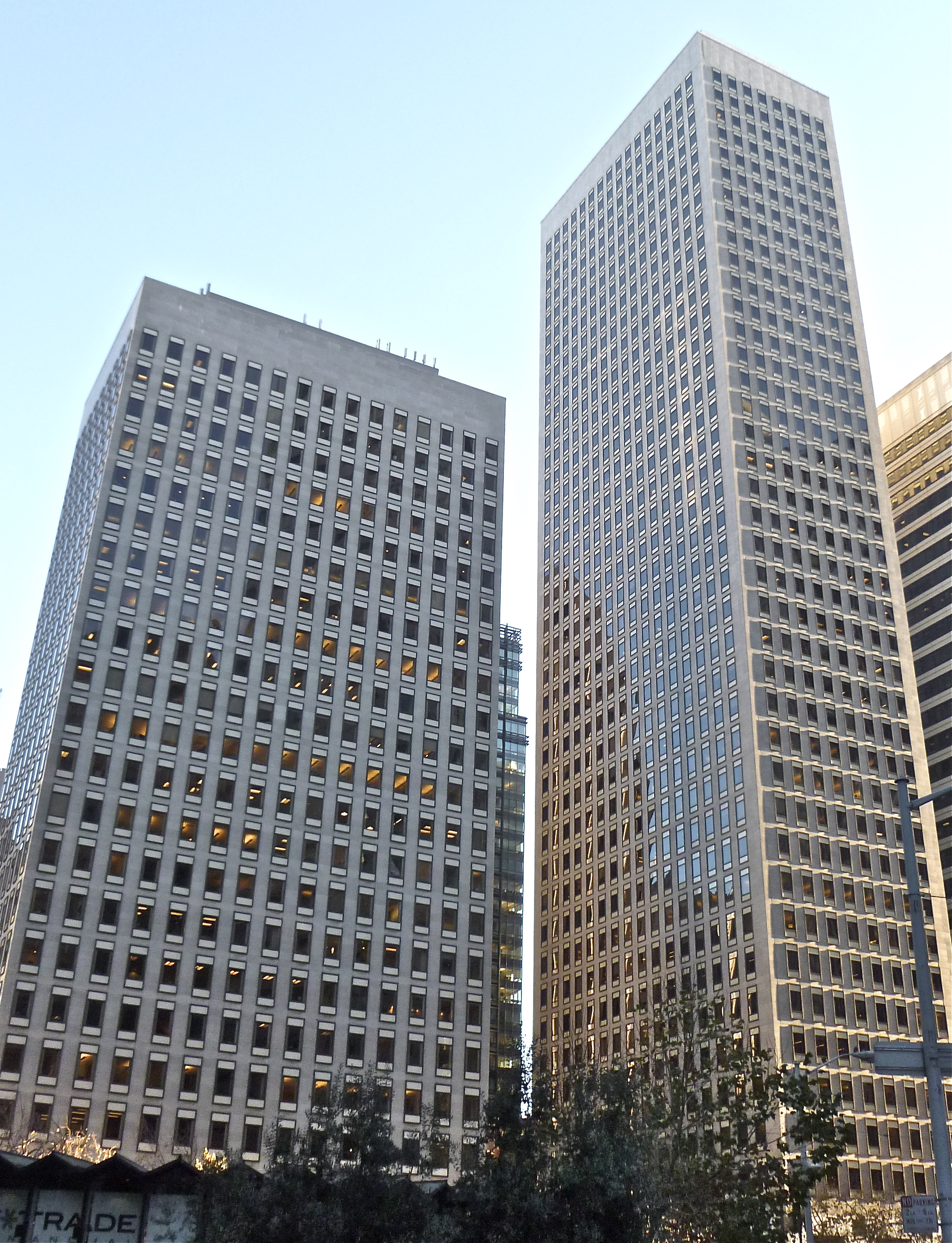
Crowe offices at Market Center in San Francisco, United States

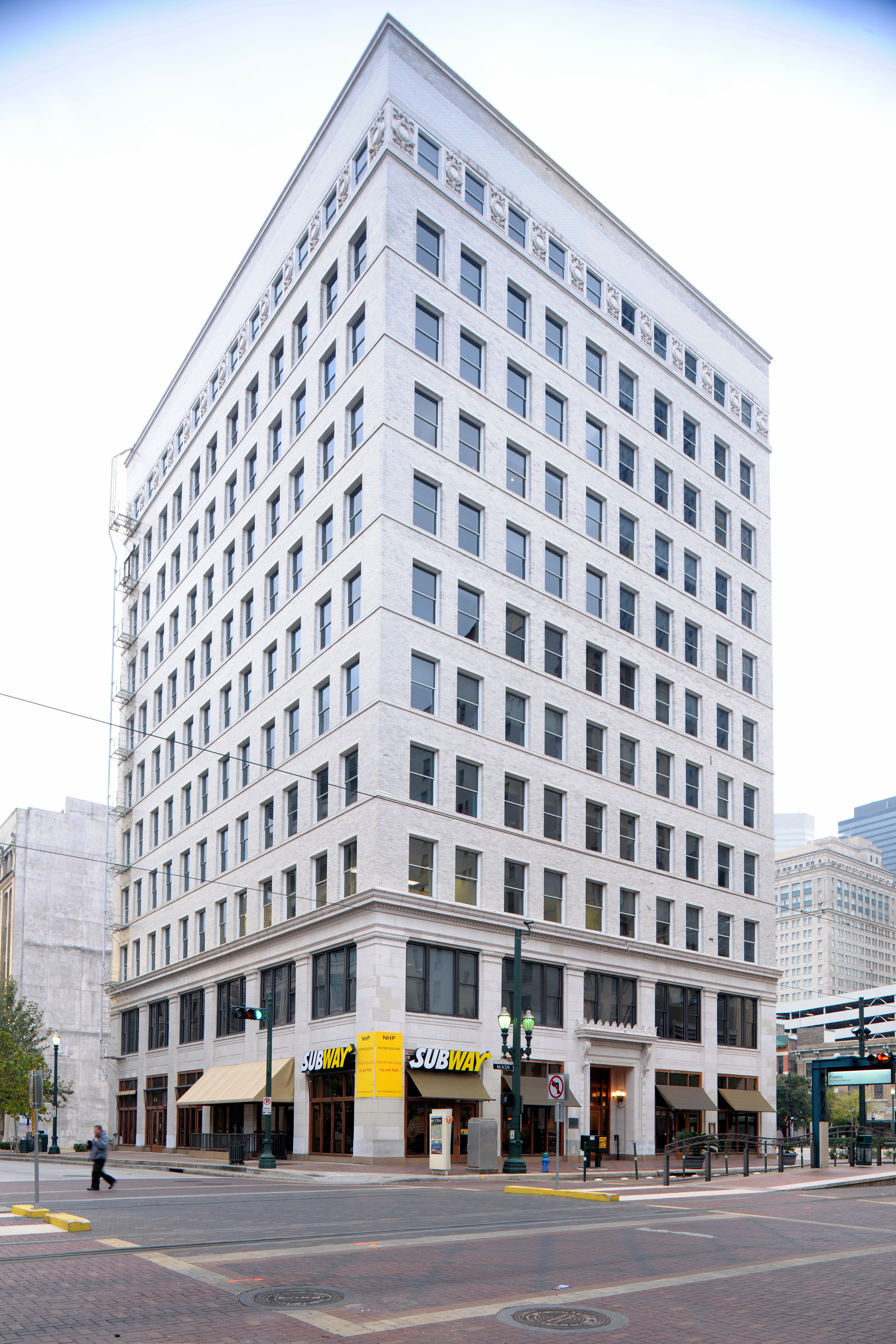
Crowe offices at the Scanlan Building in Houston, Texas, United States

In 1915, Hungarian immigrants Ernest and Edmund Horwath founded Horwath & Horwath in New York. The original practice focused on the hospitality industry. The practice later expanded to include accounting, audit and tax offerings. In 1967, it merged with Laventhol Krekstein Griffith & Co. to become Laventhol & Horwath.

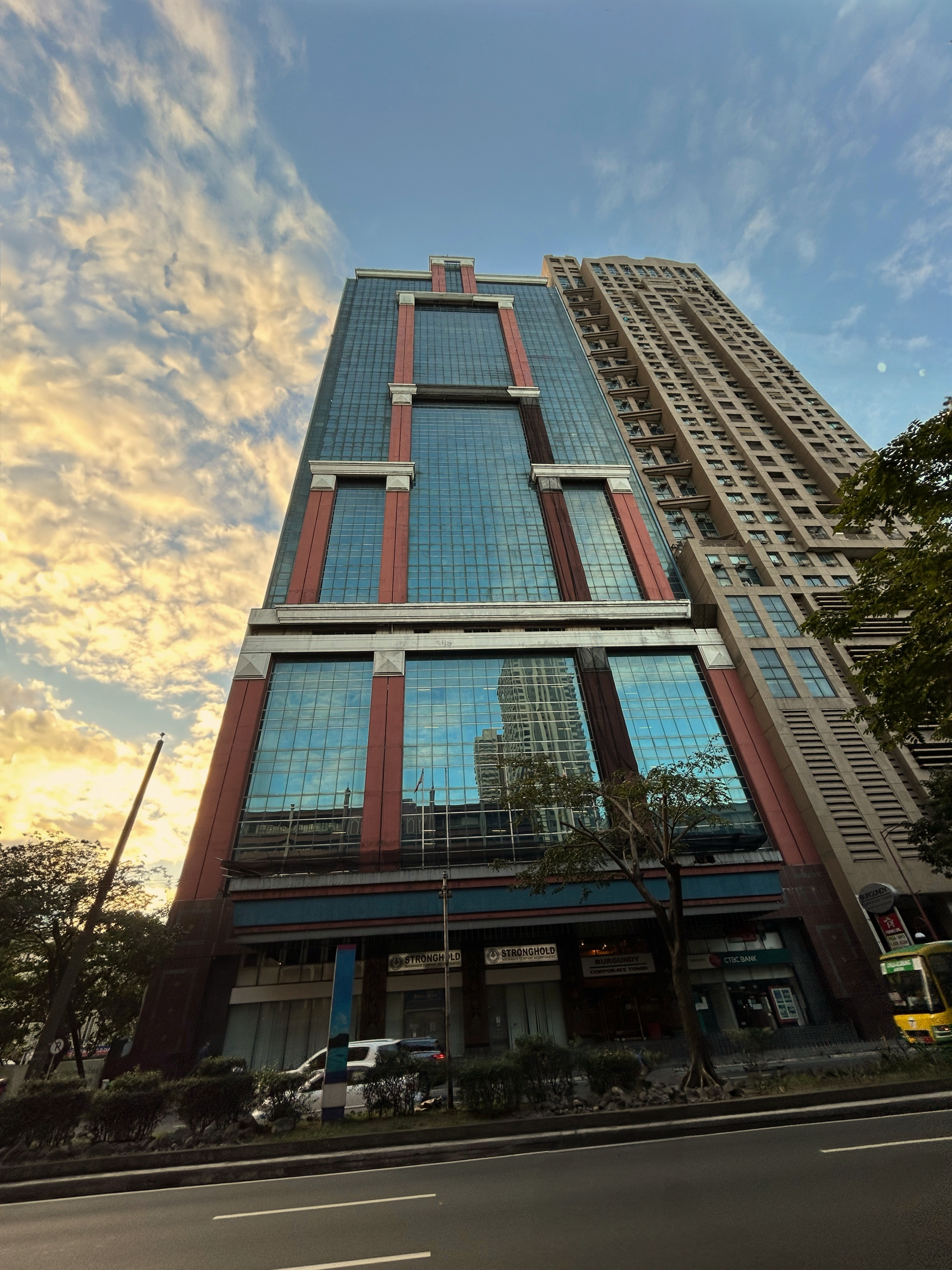
Crowe Philippines' office at 252 Gil Puyat Avenue, Makati City

Crowe Chizek was established in 1942 in South Bend, Indiana, by Fred P. Crowe Sr. and Cletus F. Chizek. Previously, Crowe had worked in public accounting for many years and also served as the St. Joseph County auditor for eight years. Chizek was head of the accounting department at the University of Notre Dame and also worked part-time in public accounting. Following the death of Fred P. Crowe Sr. in 1952, Cletus F. Chizek reorganized the firm as Crowe, Chizek and Company and two firm personnel, M. Mendel Piser and Fred P. Crowe Jr., became partners. The first legal partnership of Crowe Chizek and Company was formulated in 1962 with six founding partners: Cletus F. Chizek, M. Mendel Piser, Fred P. Crowe Jr., Robert W. Green, Joseph A. Bauters and John J. Pairitz.

By 1960, the umbrella organization Horwath & Horwath International Associates (HHIA) was established.

In 1989, Laventhol & Horwath filed for bankruptcy. In 1989, the organization shortened its name to Horwath International and in 1991 Crowe Chizek became a member of the network.

Horwath International rebranded in April 2009, as Crowe Horwath International and in June 2018, Crowe Horwath sees a further evolution of their brand with a move to the network name 'Crowe' across their independent member firms globally.

== Organization ==
In 2023, Kamel Abouchacra was named the CEO of Crowe Global.

In 2025, New York attorney Cynthia Butera, was appointed as Crowe Global's in-house legal counsel.

== See also ==
- Accounting networks and associations
- Big Four accounting firms
- Professional services
- Financial audit
- Tax advisor
