= Professional services network =

Type of business network

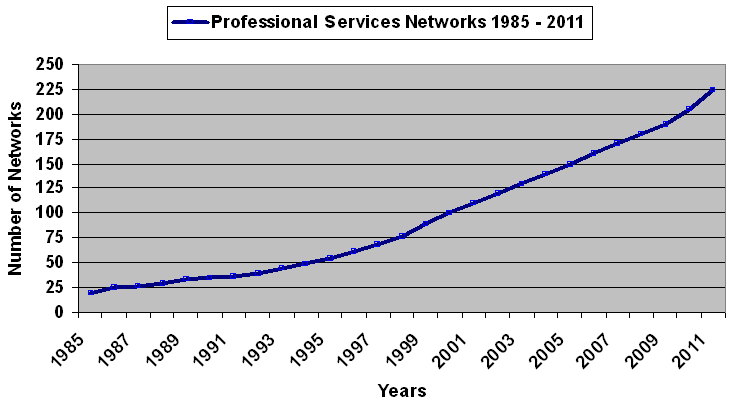
Growth professional services networks based upon review of directories of law and accounting networks and associations

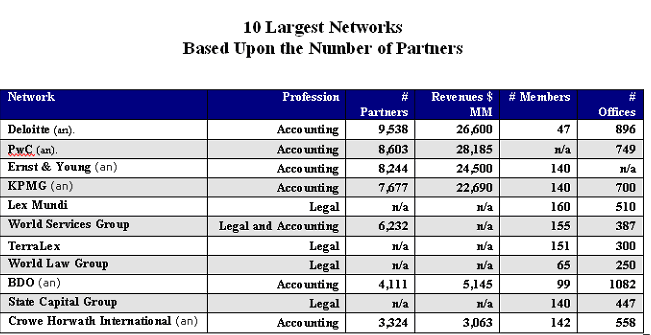
Table of largest professional services networks based upon the number of partners from survey conducted in 2011 of 200 legal and accounting networks from sources above. The table does not reflect the level of development of the network. Accounting networks are far more developed.

Professional services networks are business networks of independent firms who come together to provide professional services to clients through an organized framework. They are notably found in law and accounting. Any profession that operates in one location, but has clients in multiple locations, may provide potential members for a professional network. This entry focuses on accounting, legal, multidisciplinary and specialty practice networks. According to statistics from 2010, members of these networks employ more than one million professionals and staff and have cumulative annual revenues that exceed $200 billion.

The accounting networks developed first to meet the US Securities and Exchange Commission's requirement for public company audits. They include the well-known accounting networks like PwC, Deloitte, Ernst & Young and KPMG (also known as the Big 4 Audit Firms) as well as more than 30 other accounting networks and associations. They are highly structured entities.

The law firm network developed in the late 1980s. They include legal and law firm based multidisciplinary networks like Lex Mundi, Alliott Group, World Services Group, TerraLex, Meritas, IR Global and the State Capital Group.

There are more than 175 known networks in law, 40 in accounting, and 20 specialty networks. Individual networks have revenues exceeding $20 billion.

== Recognizing a network – the disclaimer ==
Every network from accounting networks like PwC and KPMG to law firm networks like Lex Mundi, Multilaw, and multidisciplinary networks like World Services Group (WSG) uses a "network disclaimer". A network disclaimer states that the network members are independent firms that do not practice jointly and are not responsible for the negligence of each other. It further states that generally the network does not practice a profession or otherwise provide services to clients of the network's members. This independence is the foundation of both network operations and governance.

== Why a network rather than a company ==
A major factor influencing the need for networks is the globalization of the economy. Professional services providers must be able to reach out globally to represent their clients everywhere in the world. Networks are the practical and cost-effective method to accomplish these objectives. Members of networks have access to other members who understand the local economic, legal and political factors.

From a theoretical point of view, networks are an effective model of enhancing services. The members and the networks are different parts of the resource equation for providing members quality, reliable, local and global services. There is no real limit of what can be accomplished through a network when the network and its membership work in combination with each other. This collaboration is at the heart of the network.

Networks do not practice a profession or provide the services that their members provide to their clients. Networks do not provide accounting or legal services. They operate for the benefit of the members by supporting their operations. The network can combine the resources of the individual members without risking the loss of their personal identities or financial independence.

A network is more than a support organization or collaborative framework in which the members can meet clients' needs. It is an entity that has a common corporate identity or brand. The network name can represent a standard that is required of all its members. The logo and brand are owned by the network, not the members. Membership can create a global corporate identity. The objective of this identity is network participation that will translate into business for the individual independent members.

For a company to internally develop a global and local presence would take decades and billions of dollars. For a company/firms to start a network that develops the same market penetration may take a decade and cost only millions of dollars. However, these costs are allocated among the full membership so the cost per member is low. The cost for future members to gain direct and immediate access to these resources is de minimis.

== The formation of a network ==
Professional service networks are sui generis, and each network is formed for a different reason. Current and potential members are attracted to networks in which they can pursue their own individual objectives. While networks clearly do have things in common, each must be viewed in the context of its uniqueness. A successful network is one that meets the expectations of all of its members.

The objective of a network is to create a framework which can allow the members to expand their services. Within the network they can operate to pursue their interests. These interests can include referrals, joint venturing, access to expertise, developing regional expertise, publishing articles for clients, branding, technical information exchange, market positioning, pro bono services, etc. The scope of these interests is defined not by the members but by the network.

Network organizations are defined by their purpose, structure and process. The purpose of a network is different from that of a company or professional firm in that it is limited to specific activities that will benefit its members and enhance its performance. The network's structure reflects the activities it seeks to promote and the underlying cultures of the members. Accounting, legal, multidisciplinary and specialty networks will each be different. The process is defined by how they are governed and operated.

Networks are created around common specialized assets, joint control, and a collective purpose. The specialized assets reflect the defined activities of the network. To have joint control of the assets, there needs to be collaborations among members. The collaboration necessitates a commonly understood purpose or purposes. A professional services network is neither a mere extension of the members nor only a support organization for independent professional services firms, but is rather an independent organization. It is also a business, and very different from professional associations such as bar, accounting and other associations whose membership is generally open to all qualified professionals.

== Reasons for joining networks ==
When asked why they joined, members usually state that they joined for tangible reasons: to receive referrals from other members, to have reliable firms to which they can refer, to maintain independence, to meet clients' needs, to retain existing clients by being able to provide services in other states or countries, and to obtain new clients in their market who know of the membership. They may also want to exchange knowledge that can reduce risks in their own firm's operations, or gain access to other resources. Network members also minimize possible losses by spreading risks. Membership is a proactive way to profit from change and at the same time to conserve resources. Membership can also enhance the prestige of the member by being associated with prestigious firms that the client is already using. Networks achieve these objectives through different corporate structures in which executives have command and control.

== See also ==
- Professional services
- Umbrella organization
- Business networking
- Organizational studies
- Command and control
- Law firm network
- Accounting networks and associations
  - Big Four accounting firms
- Big Three (management consultancies)
- Multidisciplinary professional services networks
