= Big Four accounting firms =

Largest global accounting networks

Logos of the Big Four.

The Big Four are the four largest professional services networks in the world: Deloitte, EY, KPMG, and PwC. The four are grouped because of their large sizes relative to their competitors, both in terms of revenue and workforce headcount; they are likewise considered comparable in their ability to provide consistent and reliable professional services to their clients. Colloquially, their networks are considered of parity to those seeking careers in the services offered by these firms because of the frequency with which they engage with Fortune 500 companies.

The Big Four offer audit, assurance, taxation, management consulting, valuation, market research, actuarial, corporate finance, and legal services to their clients. A significant majority of the audits of public companies, as well as many audits of private companies, are conducted by these four networks. Until the late 20th century, the market for these professional services was dominated by eight firms, which were accordingly nicknamed the Big Eight. The Big Eight consisted of Arthur Andersen, Arthur Young, Coopers & Lybrand, Deloitte Haskins and Sells, Ernst & Whinney, Peat Marwick Mitchell, Price Waterhouse, and Touche Ross.

The Big Eight gradually evolved into the Big Five due to mergers between some of these firms, and culminated in the 2002 collapse of Arthur Andersen, leaving four networks dominating the market at the turn of the 21st century. In the United Kingdom in 2011, it was reported that the Big Four account for the audits of 99% of the companies in the FTSE 100 Index, and 96% of the companies in the FTSE 250 Index, an index of the leading mid-cap listing companies. This high level of industry concentration has caused concern among critics, and is the chief reason some notable people of business have expressed the desire for government bodies such as the UK's Competition & Markets Authority (CMA) to consider breaking up the Big Four.

== Legal structure ==
None of the "firms" within the Big Four is actually a single firm; rather, they are professional services networks. Each is a network of firms, owned and managed independently, which have entered into agreements with the other member firms in the network to share a common name, brand, intellectual property, and quality standards. Each network has established a global entity to co-ordinate the activities of the network.

Until 2020, KPMG was the only Big Four firm not registered as a UK private company, but rather the co-ordinating entity was a Swiss association (verein). However, KPMG International changed its legal structure from a verein to a co-operative under Swiss law in 2003, then to a UK limited company in 2020. For Deloitte, PwC and Ernst & Young, the co-ordinating entity is a UK limited company. Those entities do not themselves perform external professional services, nor do they own or control the member firms. Nevertheless, these networks colloquially are referred to as "firms" for the sake of simplicity and to reduce confusion with lay-people. These accounting and professional services networks are similar in nature to how law firm networks in the legal profession work.

In many cases, each member firm practises in a single country, and is structured to comply with the regulatory environment in that country.

Ernst & Young also includes separate legal entities which manage its three geographic areas: the Americas, Asia-Pacific, and EMEIA (Europe, the Middle East, India and Africa) groups. These entities coordinate services performed by local firms within their respective areas, but do not perform services or hold ownership in the local entities. There are rare exceptions to this convention; in 2007, KPMG announced a merger of four internationally distinct member firms (in the United Kingdom, Germany, Switzerland and Liechtenstein) to form a single firm, KPMG Europe LLP.

== History of mergers ==
Since the 1980s, numerous mergers, and one major scandal involving Arthur Andersen, have reduced the number of major professional-services firms from eight to four.

=== Big Eight ===
The firms which came to be known as the "Big Eight" originated in various UK and US audit firms established in the 19th or early 20th centuries and later merged. The firms' initial international expansion was driven by the needs of British and American based multinationals for worldwide service. They expanded by forming local partnerships, or by forming alliances with local firms. Arthur Andersen was the exception: the firm originated in the United States, and then expanded internationally by establishing its own offices in other markets, including the United Kingdom.

In 1932, Fortune published an article listing the 15 largest American CPA firms by number of public corporation clients. At this point in time, Price, Waterhouse and Co. was far and away the most successful of the firms with more than double the clients compared to the firms in the second and third spots.

1932 Largest CPA Firms in the United States
Rank	Firm	Number of Clients	Most Notable Client	Today Part of
1	Price, Waterhouse and Co.	146	U.S. Steel	PwC
2	Haskins and Sells	71	General Motors	Deloitte
3	Ernst and Ernst	71	Chrysler	EY
4	Peat, Marwick, Mitchell and Co.	56	International Shoe	KPMG
5	Arthur Young and Co.	49	Swift and Company	EY
6	Lybrand, Ross Bros. and Montgomery	48	AT&T	PwC
7	Touche, Niven and Co.	27	Fox Film	Deloitte
8	Arthur Andersen and Co.	24	Montgomery Ward	N/A
9	Deloitte, Plender, Griffiths and Co.	15	American Sugar Refining Company	Deloitte
10	Barrow, Wade, Guthrie and Co.	12	Texas Gulf Sulphur	KPMG
11	Audit Co. of New York	11	Woolworth	PwC
12	Loomis, Suffern and Fernald	10	Adams Express	PwC
13	F. W. Lafrentz and Co.	10	Corn Products	KPMG
14	Miller, Donaldson and Co.	8	American Chicle	Deloitte
15	Leslie, Banks and Co.	7	American Brake Shoe and Foundry	PwC
N/A	All others	136	N/A	N/A
N/A	Companies not reporting names of auditors	355	N/A	N/A
N/A	Total	1,056	N/A	N/A

From the 1930s through the 1950s, audit firms expanded their national sizes and their service offerings. After the Wall Street crash of 1929, numerous regulations were put into place by the federal government to ensure that investors were able to view accurate and detailed financial information. As a result of the fierce competition between themselves, many of the firms merged to further expand their practices and geographic reach. These mergers led to a few name changes as the firms embraced a larger identity. In 1947, Touche, Niven and Co. merged with George Bailey and Co. and Allen R. Smart and Co. to become Touche, Niven, Bailey and Smart (TNBS). In 1950, Barrow, Wade, Guthrie and Co. merged into Peat, Marwick, Mitchell and Co., which kept the more notable PMM name. In 1955, the Audit Co. of New York merged into Price, Waterhouse and Co., again keeping PW as the firm name. In 1958, two of the firms listed on the Fortune list merged into larger firms: Loomis, Suffern and Fernald was assumed by Lybrand, Ross Bros. and Montgomery while Miller, Donaldson and Co. was assumed by Haskins and Sells. Finally, in 1960, TNBS merged with the Canadian accounting firm Ross to form Touche, Ross, Bailey and Smart (later simplified in 1969 to Touche Ross).

By 1960, business among the CPA firms had consolidated such that the top eight firms audited about 80% of all firms listed with the SEC. Around this time the term "Big Eight" came to be used to describe these CPA firms' dominance of the market. Fortune published an article in the same year listing these firms along with their number of partners, offices, and estimated gross revenues.

Big Eight Firms in 1960
Rank	Firm	Number of Partners	Number of Offices	Est. Gross Revenue (millions USD)
1	Peat, Marwick, Mitchell and Co.	190	60	45
2	Arthur Andersen and Co.	171	28	40
3	Ernst and Ernst	132	95	36
4	Price, Waterhouse and Co.	101	40	35
5	Haskins and Sells	176	36	33
6	Lybrand, Ross Bros. and Montgomery	126	35	28
7	Arthur Young and Co.	104	28	26
8	Touche, Ross, Bailey and Smart	71	27	17

In the following 20 years, the consolidation pattern continued. Two of the three remaining firms from the top 15 in 1932 outside of the Big Eight in 1960 were merged in 1963 and 1967, respectively: F. W. Lafrentz and Co. with Main and Co. to form Main Lafrentz and Co. (later merging with Thomson, McLintock and Co., a British firm, to form McLintock Main Lafrentz International or MMLI in 1969) and Leslie, Banks and Co. into Lybrand, Ross Bros. and Montgomery. Six years later, in 1973, LRBM merged with the British Cooper Bros. and Co. to form Coopers and Lybrand. In 1978, Deloitte, Plender, Griffiths and Co. merged with Haskins and Sells to become Deloitte, Haskins and Sells and one year later Ernst and Ernst merged its practice with Whinney, Murray and Co. to become Ernst and Whinney. As 1980 arrived, the Big Eight were known as the following:

- Arthur Andersen
- Arthur Young
- Coopers & Lybrand
- Deloitte, Haskins & Sells
- Ernst & Whinney
- Peat, Marwick, Mitchell and Co.
- Price, Waterhouse and Co.
- Touche Ross

In the 1980s the Big Eight, each with global branding, adopted modern marketing and grew rapidly. They merged with many smaller firms. KPMG was the result of one of the largest of these mergers. In 1987, Peat Marwick merged with the Klynveld Main Goerdeler group (which included the aforementioned MMLI) to become KPMG Peat Marwick, rebranding in 1995 to simply KPMG.

=== Big Six ===
Competition among these firms intensified, and the Big Eight became the Big Six in 1989. In that year, Ernst & Whinney merged with Arthur Young to form Ernst & Young in June, and Deloitte, Haskins & Sells merged with Touche Ross to form Deloitte & Touche in August.

The Big Six after both mergers occurred were:

- Arthur Andersen
- Coopers & Lybrand
- Deloitte & Touche
- Ernst & Young
- KPMG
- Price Waterhouse

There has been some merging of ancestor firms, in some localities, which would aggregate brands belonging to the Big Four today, but in different combinations than the present-day names would otherwise suggest. For example, the United Kingdom local firm of Deloitte, Haskins & Sells merged instead with the United Kingdom firm of Coopers & Lybrand. The resulting firm was called Coopers & Lybrand Deloitte, and the local firm of Touche Ross kept its original name. It was not until the mid-1990s that both UK firms changed their names to match those of their respective international organizations. Meanwhile, in Australia, the local firm of Touche Ross merged instead with KPMG. It is for these reasons that the Deloitte & Touche international organization was known as DRT International (later DTT International), to avoid use of names which would have been ambiguous, as well as contested, in certain markets.

=== Big Five ===
In July 1998, the Big Six became the Big Five when Price Waterhouse merged with Coopers & Lybrand to form PricewaterhouseCoopers.

The Big Five at this point in time were:

- Arthur Andersen
- Deloitte & Touche
- Ernst & Young
- KPMG
- PricewaterhouseCoopers

=== Big Four ===
Finally, the insolvency of Arthur Andersen stemming from their involvement in the 2001 Enron Scandal produced the Big Four:

- Deloitte & Touche (now known as Deloitte)
- Ernst & Young (now known as EY)
- KPMG
- PwC

The Enron collapse and ensuing investigation prompted scrutiny of the company's financial reporting and its long time auditor, Arthur Andersen. The company was indicted for obstruction of justice for shredding documents related to the audit of Enron. The resulting conviction, although later overturned, doomed Arthur Andersen, because most clients dropped the firm, and the company was not allowed to take on new clients while they were under investigation. Most of Arthur Andersen's international practices were sold to members of what is now the Big Four – notably EY globally; Deloitte in the United Kingdom, Canada, Spain, and Brazil; and PwC in China and Hong Kong.

=== Big Four merger history ===
The Big Four were all derived from a series of global mergers. The charts below show year of formation through merger, or adoption of single brand name.

Deloitte

Deloitte Touche Tohmatsu (1989) (Deloitte & Touche until 1993)
Deloitte Haskins & Sells (1978)	Touche Ross (1975)
Deloitte & Co (UK) (1845)	Haskins & Sells (US) (1895)	Touche Ross (1960) (Touche, Ross, Bailey & Smart until 1969)	Tohmatsu & Co (Japan) (1968)
Ross (Canada)	George A. Touche (UK)	Touche, Niven, Bailey & Smart (US) (1947)
Touche Niven (1900)	Bailey & Smart (1947)

EY

Ernst & Young (EY) (1989) (Ernst & Young until 2013)
Arthur Young (1985)	Ernst & Whinney (EY) (1979)
Arthur Young, McLelland, Moores & Co (1968)	Arthur Young Broads; Paterson & Co (1923)	Stuart & Young (1894)	Ernst & Ernst (US) (1903)	Whinney, Smith & Whinney (UK) (1849)

KPMG

KPMG (1987) (KPMG Peat Marwick before 1995)
Peat Marwick (1925) (originally Peat; Marwick Mitchell)	KMG (1979) (officially Klynveld; Main Goerdeler)	Armitage & Norton (1869–1987)
William Barclay; Peat (UK) (1870)	Marwick Mitchell (US) (1897)	Edwin Gurthie (1875–1955)	Beevers & Adgie (1849–1967)	Klynveld Kraayenhof (Netherlands) (1917)	McLintock Main; Lafrentz (1964)	Deutsche Treuhand-Gesellschaft (Germany) (1890)
Thomson McLintock (UK) (1877)	Main Lafrentz (US) (c.1880)
Martin Farlow (1882–1968)	Grace Ryland (1967–1969)
Grace, Darbyshire, & Todd (1818)	CJ Ryland (1910)

PwC

PricewaterhouseCoopers (PwC) (1998) (PricewaterhouseCoopers until 2010)
Coopers & Lybrand (1973)	Price Waterhouse (US) (1849)
Cooper Brothers (UK) (1854)	Lybrand, Ross Bros, Montgomery (US) (1898)

== Revenue comparison ==
In 2010, Deloitte, with its 1.8% growth, was able to outpace PricewaterhouseCoopers' 1.5% growth, gaining "first place" in revenue size, and became the largest firm in the professional services industry. In 2011, PwC re-gained first place with 10% revenue growth. In 2013, these two firms claimed the top two spots with only a $200 million revenue difference, that is, within half a percent. However, Deloitte saw faster growth than PwC over the next few years (largely due to acquisitions) and reclaimed the title of largest of the Big Four in Fiscal Year 2016.

It was estimated that the Big Four had about a 67% share of the global accountancy market in 2012, while most of the rest was divided among so called mid-tier players, such as BDO, Crowe Global and Grant Thornton.

Rank	Firm	Fiscal year ending & ref.	Revenues (US$)	Revenue gap % to next largest	Revenue gap % to top firm	Employees	Revenue per employee	Audit & Assurance	Tax & Legal	Consulting & Advisory	Consulting % of Total
1st	Deloitte	2026-05-31	$74.5 bn (▲$4.0 bn, 5.7%)	Top firm (Top firm PY)	Top firm (Top firm PY)	496,860 (▲23,810, 5.0%)	$149,942 (▲$909, 0.6%)	$15.8 bn (▲$1.1 bn, 7.5%)	$13.2 bn (▲$1.0 bn, 8.2%)	$45.7 bn (▲$2.0 bn, 4.6%)	61.3% (▼ −0.7%)
2nd	PwC	2026-06-30	$60.2 bn (▲$3.3 bn, 5.8%)	−19% vs Deloitte (−19% vs Deloitte PY)	−19% (−19% PY)	369,945 (▲5,945, 1.6%)	$162,727 (▲$6,408, 4.1%)	$20.5 bn (▲$0.7 bn, 3.5%)	$13.9 bn (▲$1.2 bn, 9.4%)	$25.8 bn (▲$1.4 bn, 5.7%)	42.9% ( 0.0%)
3rd	EY	2026-06-30	$57.0 bn (▲$3.8 bn, 7.1%)	−5% vs PwC (−7% vs PwC PY)	−23% (−25% PY)	415,182 (▲8,973, 2.2%)	$137,289 (▲$6,322, 4.8%)	$18.9 bn (▲$1.0 bn, 5.6%)	$13.8 bn (▲$1.1 bn, 8.7%)	$24.3 bn (▲$1.7 bn, 7.5%)	42.6% (▲0.1%)
4th	KPMG	2025-09-30	$39.8 bn (▲$1.4 bn, 3.6%)	−30% vs EY (−28% vs EY PY)	−47% (−46% PY)	276,030 (▲742, 0.3%)	$144,187 (▲$4,697, 3.4%)	$14.1 bn (▲$0.7 bn, 5.2%)	$9.3 bn (▲$0.6 bn, 6.9%)	$16.4 bn (▲$0.1 bn, 0.6%)	41.2% (▼ −1.2%)
Total			$231.5 bn (▲$12.5 bn, 5.7%)	—	—	1,558,017 (▲39,470, 2.6%)	$148,586 (▲$4,370, 3.0%)	$69.3 bn (▲$3.5 bn, 5.3%)	$50.2 bn (▲$3.9 bn, 8.4%)	$112.2 bn (▲$5.2 bn, 4.9%)	48.5% (▼ −0.4%)

Note: Consulting & Advisory includes the following service lines reported by each firm. Further, columns may not cross-add due to rounding in numbers reported by each firm.
- Deloitte: Strategy, Risk & Transactions (SR&T); Technology & Transformation (T&T) (F2026 financial statement categories)
- PwC: Advisory (F2026 financial statement categories)
- EY: Consulting; EY Parthenon (F2026 financial statement categories)
- KPMG: Advisory (F2025 financial statement categories)

=== Revenue comparison charts ===
Big Four Accounting Firm Revenues (US$ bn)

View source data.

Revenue gap to largest firm (%)

View source data.

Revenue gap to largest firm (US$ bn)

View source data.

Total Employees

View source data.

Revenue Per Employee

View source data.

Audit & Assurance Revenue (US$ bn)

View source data.

Tax Revenue (US$ bn)

View source data.

Consulting & Advisory Revenue (US$ bn)

View source data.

Consulting % of Total Revenue

View source data.

== Criticism ==
=== Audit quality and ethics ===
A 2019 analysis by Public Company Accounting Oversight Board (PCAOB) in the United States observed that the big four accounting firms bungled almost 31% of their audits since 2009. In another project study on government oversight, it was seen that while the auditors colluded to present audit reports that pleased their clients, the times they did not resulted in a loss of business. Despite this large-scale collusion in audits, the PCAOB in its 16-year history has only made 18 enforcement cases against the "big four". Although these auditors have failed audits in 31% of cases (808 cases in total), they have only faced action by PCAOB in 6.6% of the cases. KPMG at that point had never been fined despite having the worst audit failure rate of 36.6%.

As per the Financial Reporting Council (FRC) none of the Big Four – Deloitte, EY, KPMG, and PwC managed to surpass the 90% target of its audits. The inefficiency in audit was resulting in a loss of investors' money, people's pension plans, stakeholders' livelihoods and was putting a question mark on the credibility of audited financial statements. "At a time when the future of the audit sector is under the microscope, the latest audit quality results are not acceptable," said Stephen Haddrill, the FRC's Chief executive. Multiple ethics scandals and questionable practices across the globe led to multi-million dollar fines and subsequent settlements by all the Big Four firms.

Despite repeated sanctions from regulators, the Big Four have seen continued challenges to audit quality and ethics as the 2020 decade comes to a close.

1. In May 2018, KPMG was accused of being "complicit" in signing off Carillion's "increasingly fantastical figures" before Carillion ultimately collapsed.
2. In January 2020, PwC faces allegations of potential conflict of interest in its audit of Sonangol, given its dual roles of both auditor and consultant.
3. In September 2020, Deloitte was fined £15 million (US$19.4 million) by the FRC for failing to apply sufficient professional skepticism in its audits of Autonomy's 2009 to 2011 financial statements prior to Autonomy's acquisition by Hewlett-Packard.
4. In June 2020, EY was accused of poor auditing for failing to discover that €1.9 billion in cash was missing at Wirecard AG, precipitating Wirecard's collapse and eventual sale to Santander Bank for €100 million in November 2020.

=== Tax avoidance ===
According to Australian taxation expert George Rozvany, the Big Four are "the masterminds of multinational tax avoidance and the architects of tax schemes which cost governments and their taxpayers an estimated US$1 trillion a year". At the same time they are advising governments on tax reforms, they are advising their multinational clients on how to avoid taxes.

The PwC tax scandal is one example where PwC sold advice to clients on tax avoidance, and did so using information obtained from PwC tax experts consulting for the Australian Tax Office and Department of Treasury.

=== Market concentration and alleged collusion amongst the Big Four ===
In the wake of industry concentration and the occasional firm failure, the issue of a credible alternative industry structure has been raised. The limiting factor on the expansion of the Big Four to include additional firms, is that although some of the firms in the next tier have become quite substantially large, or have formed international networks, effectively all large public companies insist on having an audit performed by a Big Four network. This creates the complication that smaller firms have no way to compete well enough to make it into the top end of the market.

Documents published in June 2010 show that some UK companies' banking covenants required them to use one of the Big Four. This approach from the lender prevents firms in the next tier from competing for audit work for such companies. The British Bankers' Association said that such clauses are rare. Current discussions in the UK consider outlawing such clauses.

In February 2011, the Irish Director of Corporate Enforcement Paul Appleby said that auditors "report surprisingly few types of company law offences to us", with the so-called "big four" auditing firms reporting the least often to his office, at just 5% of all reports.

In 2011, the House of Lords of United Kingdom completed an inquiry into the financial crisis, and called for an Office of Fair Trading investigation into the dominance of the Big Four. In September 2019, Bloomberg News reported that The Big Four controlled 95% of the FTSE 250 audit market by client numbers and 96% by market capitalization in August 2019, according to Adviser Rankings.

In 2018, an Australian parliamentary committee was told that the heads of the Big Four firms have met regularly for dinner. The revelation was among issues which led to an inquiry by the Australian Competition & Consumer Commission into possible collusion in the selling of audit and other services. However, Ernst & Young told the inquiry that the dinners, which were held once or twice a year, were to discuss industry trends and issues of corporate culture such as inclusion and diversity.

The January 2018 collapse of the UK construction and services company Carillion raised further questions about the Big Four, all of which had advised the company before its liquidation. On 13 February 2018, the Big Four were described by Member of Parliament (MP) and chair of the Work and Pensions Select Committee Frank Field as "feasting on what was soon to become a carcass" after collecting fees of £72m for Carillion work during the years leading up to its collapse. The final report of a Parliamentary inquiry into the collapse of Carillion, published on 16 May 2018, accused the Big Four accounting firms of being a "cosy club", with KPMG singled out for its "complicity" in signing off on Carillion's "increasingly fantastical figures" and internal auditor Deloitte accused of failing to identify, or ignoring, "terminal failings". The report recommended the Government refer the statutory audit market to the Competition and Markets Authority (CMA), urging consideration of breaking up the Big Four. In September 2018, Business Secretary Greg Clark announced he had asked the CMA to conduct an inquiry into competition in the audit sector, and on 9 October 2018, the CMA announced it had launched a detailed study. In July 2020, the UK Financial Reporting Council told the Big Four that they must submit plans by October 2020 to separate their audit and consultancy operations by 2024.

== See also ==
- Accounting network
- Other "Big" industries
  - Big Four (banking)
  - Big Oil
  - Big Soda
  - Big Tech
  - Big Three (automobile manufacturers)
  - Big Three (management consultancies)
  - Big Tobacco
- Consulting firm
- Corporate services
- LuxLeaks
- Panama Papers
- Professional services network
- Big Four film studios
