= Professional services =

Certain occupations in the service sector

Professional services are occupations in the service sector requiring special training in liberal arts and pure sciences education or professional development education. Some professional services, such as architects, accountants, engineers, doctors, and lawyers require the practitioner to hold professional degrees or licenses and possess specific skills. Other professional services involve providing specialist business support to businesses of all sizes and in all sectors; this can include tax advice, supporting a company with accounting, IT services, public relations services or providing management services.

== Definition ==
Many industry groups have been used for academic research, while looking at professional services firms, making a clear definition hard to attain. Some work has been directed at better defining professional service firms (PSF). In particular, Von Nordenflycht generated a taxonomy of professional service firms, defining four types:

1. Classic PSFs (e.g. law and accounting firms): characterized by a high knowledge intensity, a professionalized workforce, and low capital intensity
2. Professional campuses (e.g. hospitals): characterized by high knowledge intensity, a professionalized workforce, and high capital intensity
3. Neo-PSFs (e.g. management consultants): characterized by high knowledge intensity and a low capital intensity
4. Technology developers (e.g. R&D firms, biotechs): characterized by high knowledge intensity and a high capital intensity

Frameworks such as this aid the ability of managers and academics to better understand how such firms manage themselves and how to judge benchmark practices.

== Example occupations ==
There is no definitive list of occupations in professional services, but examples include the following:

- Accountant
- Actuary
- Appraiser
- Architect
- Consultant
- Doctor
- Evaluator
- Engineer
- Financial planner
- Geoscientist
- Investment manager
- Information technology consulting
- Inspector
- Lawyer
- Management consultant
- Public Relations
- Social Workers
- Supply chain management
- Training and development
- Urban planner
- Veterinary physician

== Provision ==
Professional services can be provided by sole proprietors, partnerships or corporations. A person providing the service can often be described as a consultant. In law, barristers normally organise themselves into chambers. Businesses in other industries, such as banks and retailers, can employ individuals or teams to offer professional services for their customers. Major cities such as London and New York are leading global centres for professional services firms.

== Marketing ==
The marketing and selection of professional-service providers may depend on skill, knowledge, experience, reputation, capacity, ethics, and creativity. Large corporations may have a formal procurement process for engaging professional services. Prices for services, even within the same field, may vary greatly. Professional-service providers may offer fixed rates for specific work, charge in relation to the number or seniority of people engaged, or charge in relation to the success or profit generated by the project.

== See also ==
- Big Four auditors
- pro bono
- Outline of consulting
- Professional services network
- White-shoe firm
