= Lasham Airfield =

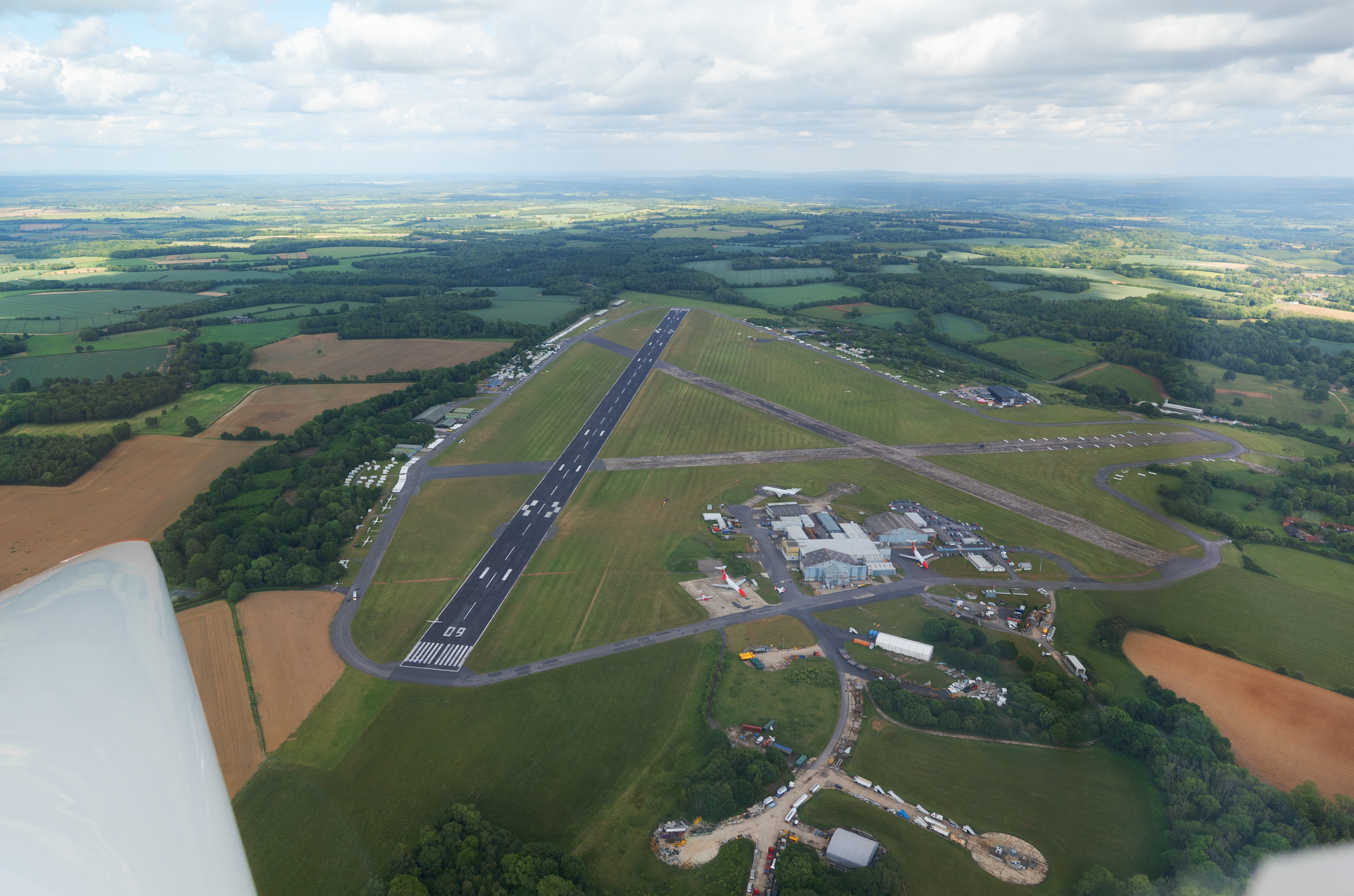
- Aerial photograph c.2025
- IATA: QLA; ICAO: EGHL

Summary
- Airport type: Private
- Owner: Lasham Gliding Society
- Operator: Lasham Gliding Society
- Serves: Lasham, Hampshire, England
- Location: Alton
- Elevation AMSL: 618 ft (188 m)
- Coordinates: 51°11′14″N 001°02′01″W
- Website: https://www.lashamgliding.com/

Map
- Location in Hampshire

Runways
Direction	Length		Surface
Direction	m	ft	Surface
09/27	1,797	5,896	Asphalt

Lasham Airfield (IATA: QLA, ICAO: EGHL) is an aerodrome 3.6 miles (5.8 km) north-west of Alton in Hampshire, England, on the North side of Lasham village.

The airfield was built on farming land in 1942 as a Royal Air Force Station during the Second World War. The RAF ceased operations in 1948, but an aircraft company, General Aircraft Ltd, continued to fly from the airfield. From 1951, the main activity at Lasham airfield became recreational gliding.

The airfield is now the home of the largest British gliding club, also one of the world's largest, Lasham Gliding Society Ltd (LGS), which bought the land in 1999 from the Ministry of Defence. The airfield is also the location of 2Excel Engineering Ltd., a company that maintains jet aircraft for various airlines.

Pilots of powered aircraft visiting the airfield require prior permission and a briefing on its hazards: in particular dense concentrations of thermalling gliders (up to 100 gliders can be in the vicinity at once), winch cables up to 3,000 ft (910 m) above the ground, and occasional movements of large jet airliners. Over-flying aircraft are requested to not fly below 3,618 ft (1,103 m) QNH. The airfield frequency is 131.030 MHz.

== Military history ==
The airfield was built on farmland in 1942, causing the A339 (Alton-Basingstoke road) to be diverted to the west from Lasham village. Initial RAF operations (from November that year) were by 38 Wing, Army Co-operation Command.

Maps of the area before and after the airfield was constructed are displayed in the main corridor of the clubhouse of Lasham Gliding Society on the North side of the airfield. Also displayed are photographs and other details of aircraft and personnel of the squadrons that flew from Lasham and are listed below.

In mid-1943, the airfield was transferred to RAF Fighter Command. Squadrons equipped with Hawker Hurricanes, Hawker Typhoons and Supermarine Spitfires operated from Lasham.

Later in 1943, it became a base for the bombers of No. 2 Group RAF, part of the RAF Second Tactical Air Force. The squadrons of 2 Group used the de Havilland Mosquito and North American B-25 Mitchell.

=== Squadrons based at Lasham during the war ===
(apart from one- or two-night stays)

- No. 412 Squadron RCAF, Spitfire VB, arrived 7 Mar 1943; departed 8 Apr 1943
- No. 181 Squadron RAF Typhoon IB, arrived 5 Apr 1943; departed 6 Jun 1943
- No. 602 (City of Glasgow) Squadron Auxiliary Air Force Spitfire VB, arrived 14 Apr 1943; departed 29 Apr 1943
- No. 183 Squadron RAF Typhoon IB, arrived 3 May 1943; departed 30 May 1943
- No. 182 Squadron RAF Typhoon IB, arrived 3 May 1943; departed 2 Jun 1943
- No. 320 (Netherlands) Squadron RAF Mitchell II, arrived 30 Aug 1943; departed 18 Feb 1944.
- No. 613 (City of Manchester) Squadron AAF, Mosquito FB.VI, arrived 12 Oct 1943; departed 30 Oct 1944
- No. 305 Polish Bomber Squadron Mitchell II and Mosquito VI, arrived 18 Nov 1943, departed 30 Oct 1944
- No. 107 Squadron RAF Mosquito VI, arrived 1 Feb 1944; departed 23 Oct 1944

=== Units ===
The following units were here at some point:

- No. 83 Group Disbandment Centre
- No. 84 Group Support Unit (??-1945) became No. 84 Group Disbandment Centre (1945-??)
- No. 124 Airfield Headquarters RAF (1943)
- No. 138 Airfield Headquarters RAF (1943-44) became No. 138 (Bomber) Wing RAF (1944)
- No. 414 Air Stores Park
- No. 417 Repair & Salvage Unit
- No. 2758 Squadron RAF Regiment
- No. 2791 Squadron RAF Regiment
- No. 2831 Squadron RAF Regiment
- No. 2883 Squadron RAF Regiment
- No. 3207 Servicing Commando
- No. 3209 Servicing Commando
- No. 3210 Servicing Commando

On 14 April 1944, at the request of resistance workers, six Mosquitos of 613 Squadron led by Wing Commander Robert Bateson bombed the Central Records Registry of the Gestapo in The Hague from a height of 50 ft (15 m). The accuracy was such that the incriminating records were burnt. There was loss of life amongst the Dutch and German staff, but there were few civilian casualties in the nearby streets.

On the nights preceding and following D-Day, the Mosquitos of 305 and 613 squadrons carried out low level attacks on enemy supply lines and armoured positions in Normandy to assist the allied landing forces. The airfield ceased to be an operational Royal Air Force station in 1948, though General Aircraft Ltd continued testing military gliders there. On 14 September 2006, a memorial at the entrance was dedicated to those who served at Lasham between 1942 and 1948.

In 1952, future world champion Mike Hawthorn occasionally used its perimeter track to test his Cooper-Bristol Formula Two car, as did others.

In the 1960s the Space Department of the Royal Aircraft Establishment with its HQ at Farnborough, sited a number of satellite tracking and receiving dish aerials on the south side of Lasham airfield, one enclosed in a large white dome. These have now been removed, as have most of the buildings dating from World War II.

== Gliding ==
=== Early days ===
In 1950, the Army Gliding Club was re-established by Major Tony Deane-Drummond, then an instructor at the Royal Military Academy Sandhurst. It operated at Odiham Airfield, but after two accidents, the Commandant of Sandhurst ordered it to suspend operations. In early 1951, he ordered Major Deane-Drummond to restart the club at Lasham. In the meantime, the Surrey Gliding Club and Imperial College Gliding Club were both seeking a new home because Redhill Aerodrome had many other users. The Surrey club and Imperial College therefore moved to Lasham in August 1951. As well as Tony Deane-Drummond, other notable instructors at that time included Ann Welch, Lorne Welch and Philip Wills. All of them went on to become British champions. A war-surplus barrage balloon winch was used for launches. Types flown included Slingsby T.21B trainer, Grunau Baby, and various other pre-war German sailplanes.

=== Lasham Gliding Society ===
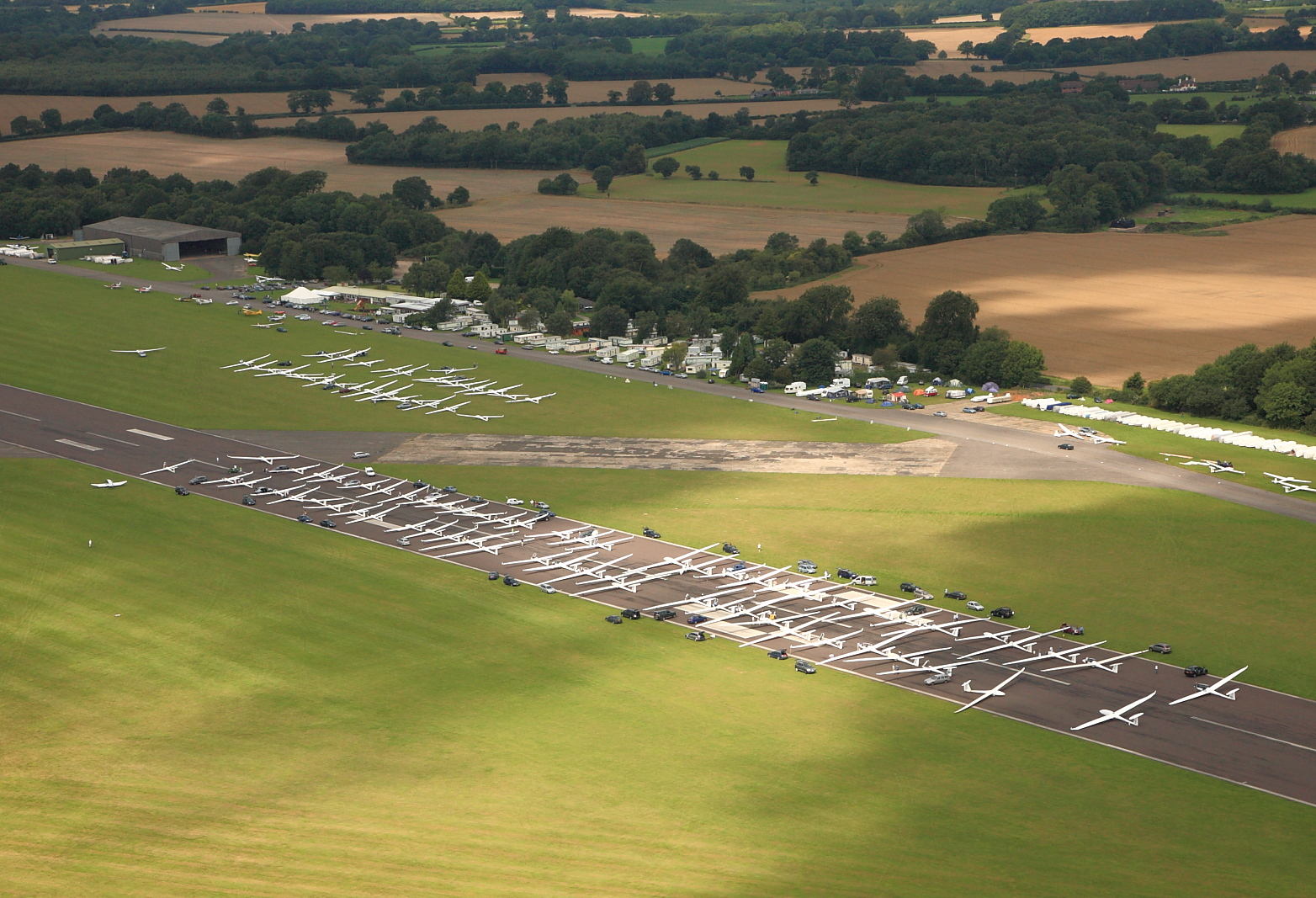
Competition grid at Lasham Airfield in 2009

Lasham Gliding Society (LGS) was established in 1958 to unify operations of the gliding clubs that had been operating since 1951. It later signed a long lease on the airfield from the Ministry of Defence. The airfield's boundaries were reduced but it still occupies over 500 acres (200 ha).

237 gliders are based at Lasham which are used by 632 flying members, plus social members. The airfield is in constant use throughout the year and regularly hosts national and regional gliding championships. Oerlinghausen Airfield claims to be the world's largest gliding club with "around 25,000" glider launches annually whereas Lasham launched 25,750 gliders in the year to 31 October 2014. There were approximately 59,000 aircraft movements (departures and landings) in that year (compared with Southampton Airport's 43,350).

In 1999, Lasham Gliding Society completed the purchase from the Ministry of Defence of the freehold to the airfield, making the final payment in 2001. It now owns all of the land within the fenced and gated area as well as the fields that form the undershoot area at each end of the main runway.

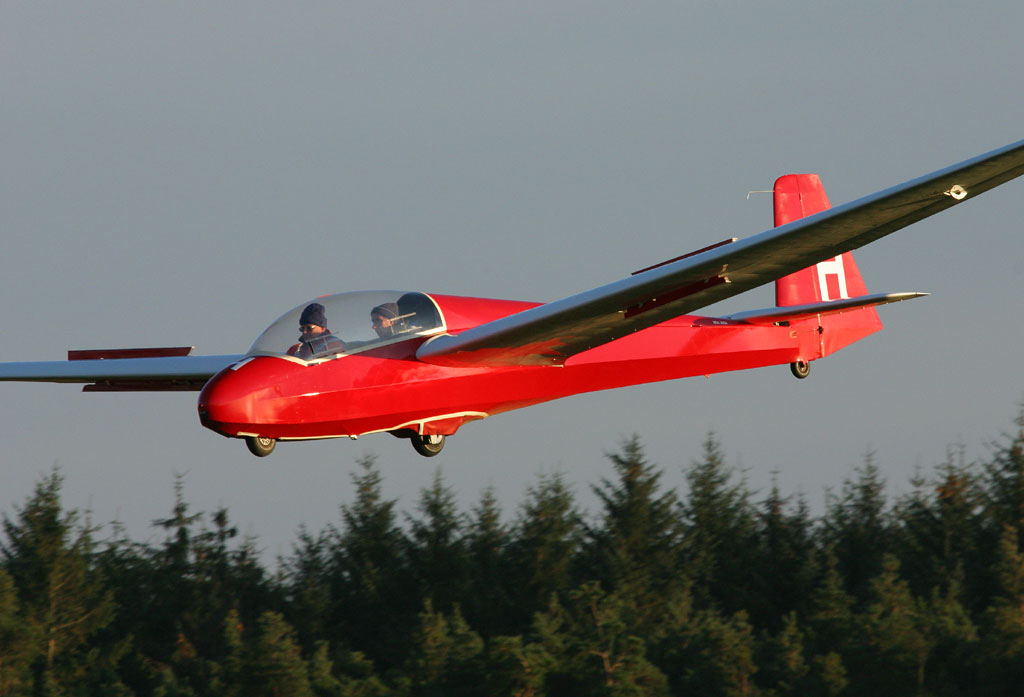
LGS K13 glider landing

LGS's 90+ instructors train new pilots at all stages from ab initio through to competitive cross-country flying. The training fleet consists of the following types:

- ASK 13 (three basic trainers)
- ASK 21 (six glass-fibre trainers/aerobatic trainers)
- Duo Discus XLT (advanced trainer with turbo)
- Discus (three cross-country single-seaters)
- Grob G102 (four single-seaters)
- Scheibe SF-25 Falke motor glider
- Grob G109B motor glider

The club uses three Skylaunch winches, normally delivering launch heights of 1500 ft and over 2500 ft in strong winds. The club also operates five tugs:

- 1 PA-25 Pawnee
- 4 Robin DR400s

and can call on a number of privately owned tugs in busy periods.

There are 221 other gliders at the airfield operated by private owners and by affiliated gliding clubs: Imperial College Gliding Club and The Crown Service Gliding Club. Lasham Youth run a Saturday Evening gliding course during the summer months which is open to everyone, providing an environment where young members can fly with people of similar ages. The Gliding Heritage Centre has two separate hangars on the south side containing over 40 historic gliders, many of which are in flying condition.

Derek Piggott was Chief Flying Instructor at Lasham during much of the period from 1953 to 1989.

Other famous aeronautical characters Ann Welch, Nicholas Goodhart, Ralph Hooper, Frank Irving and Peter Twiss were also Lasham members.

=== Imperial College Gliding Club ===
Imperial College Gliding Club is the oldest, and one of the largest, university gliding clubs in the United Kingdom. Founded in 1930, the club was the second club to become affiliated to the British Gliding Association. The club started by building its own glider Payne I.C.1. It has for most of its life flown from Lasham Airfield in Hampshire after transferring from Redhill in 1951. It operates under the auspices of Lasham Gliding Society who provide its launching facilities and many of its instructors.The club maintains an archive website where details of the club's history since 1930 are kept. It has 93 student members. Its most notable member was Frank Irving.

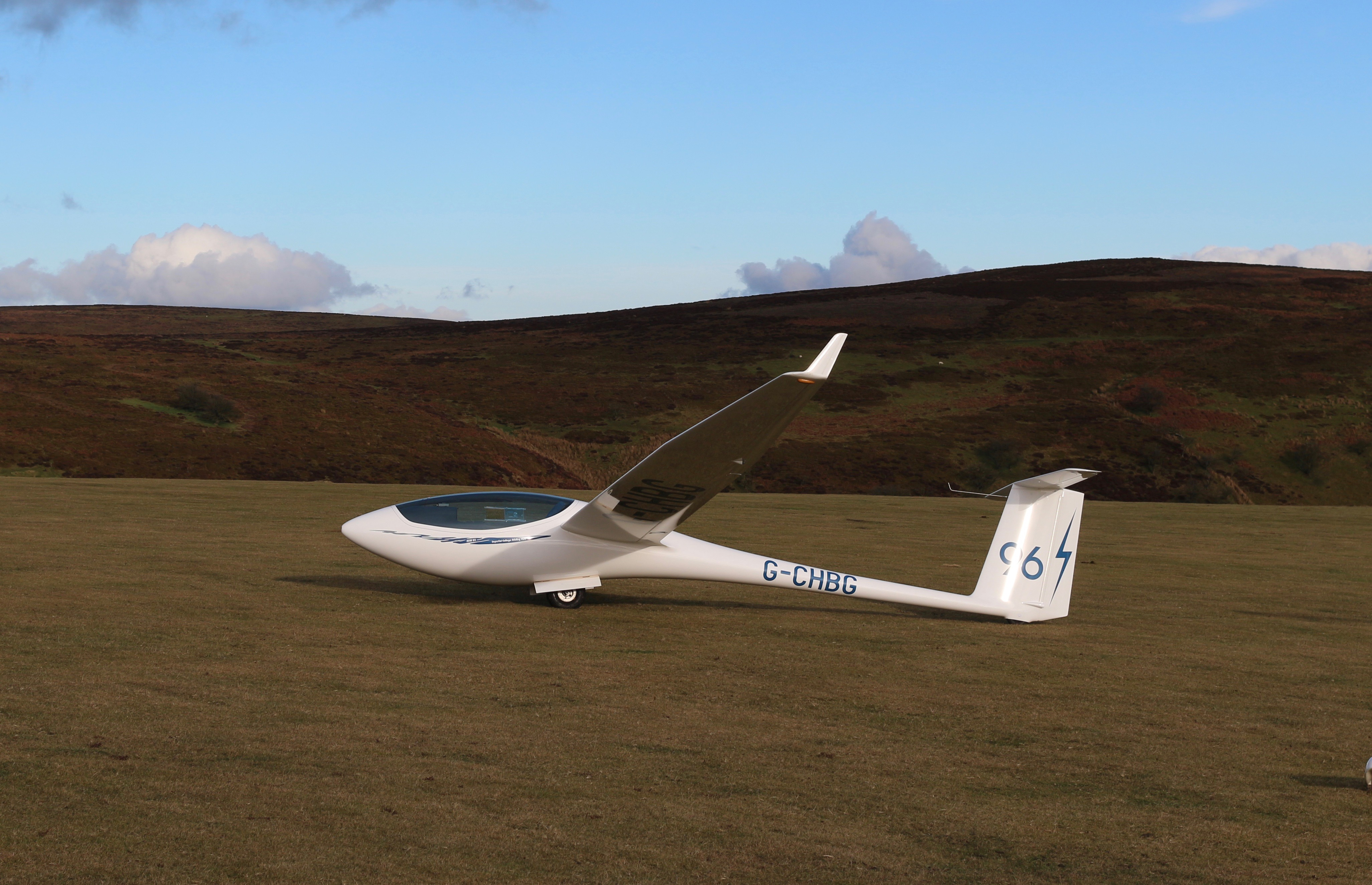
ICGC's ASW 24 '96' at the Long Mynd .

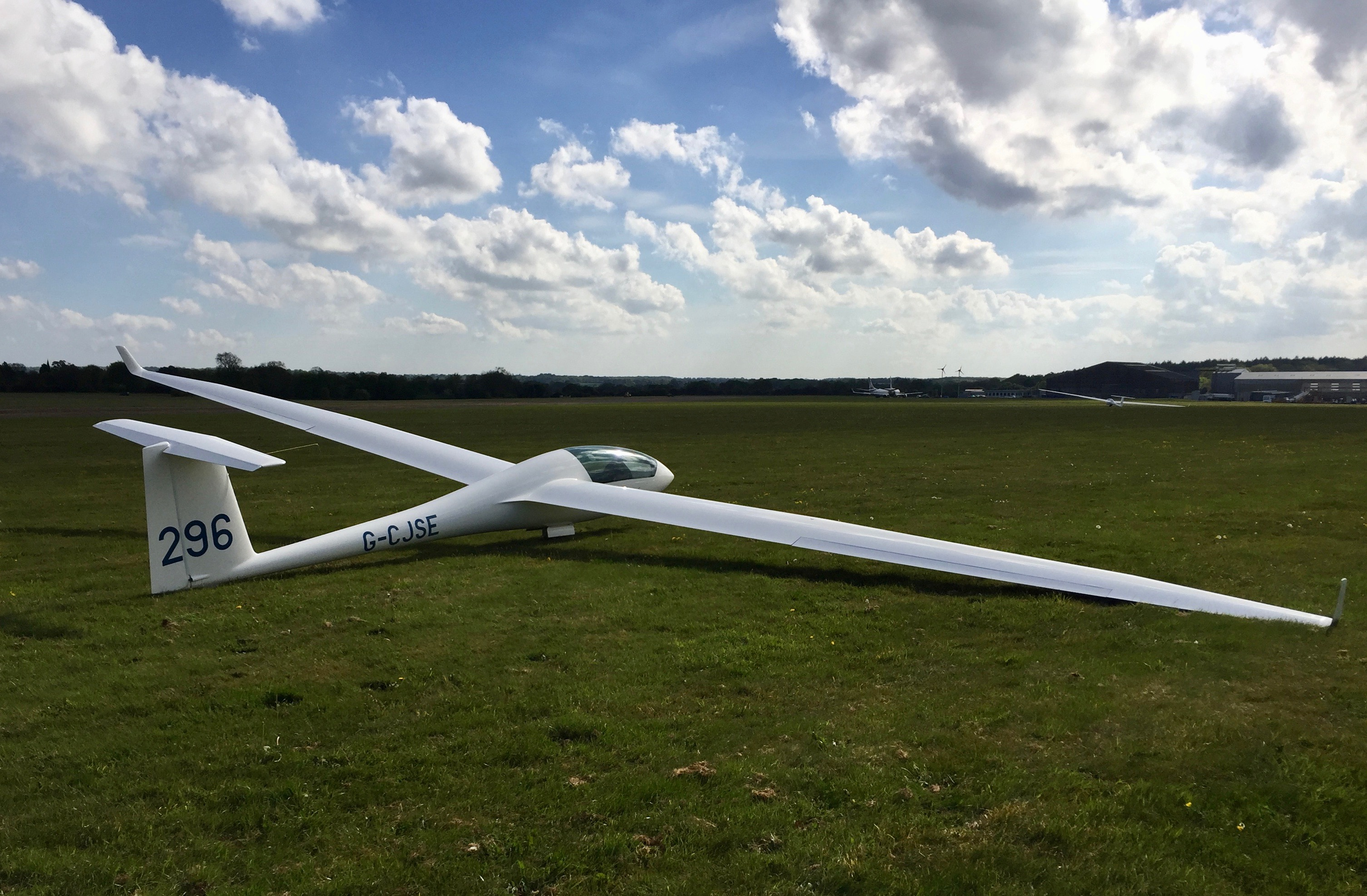
IGC's Discus B '296'

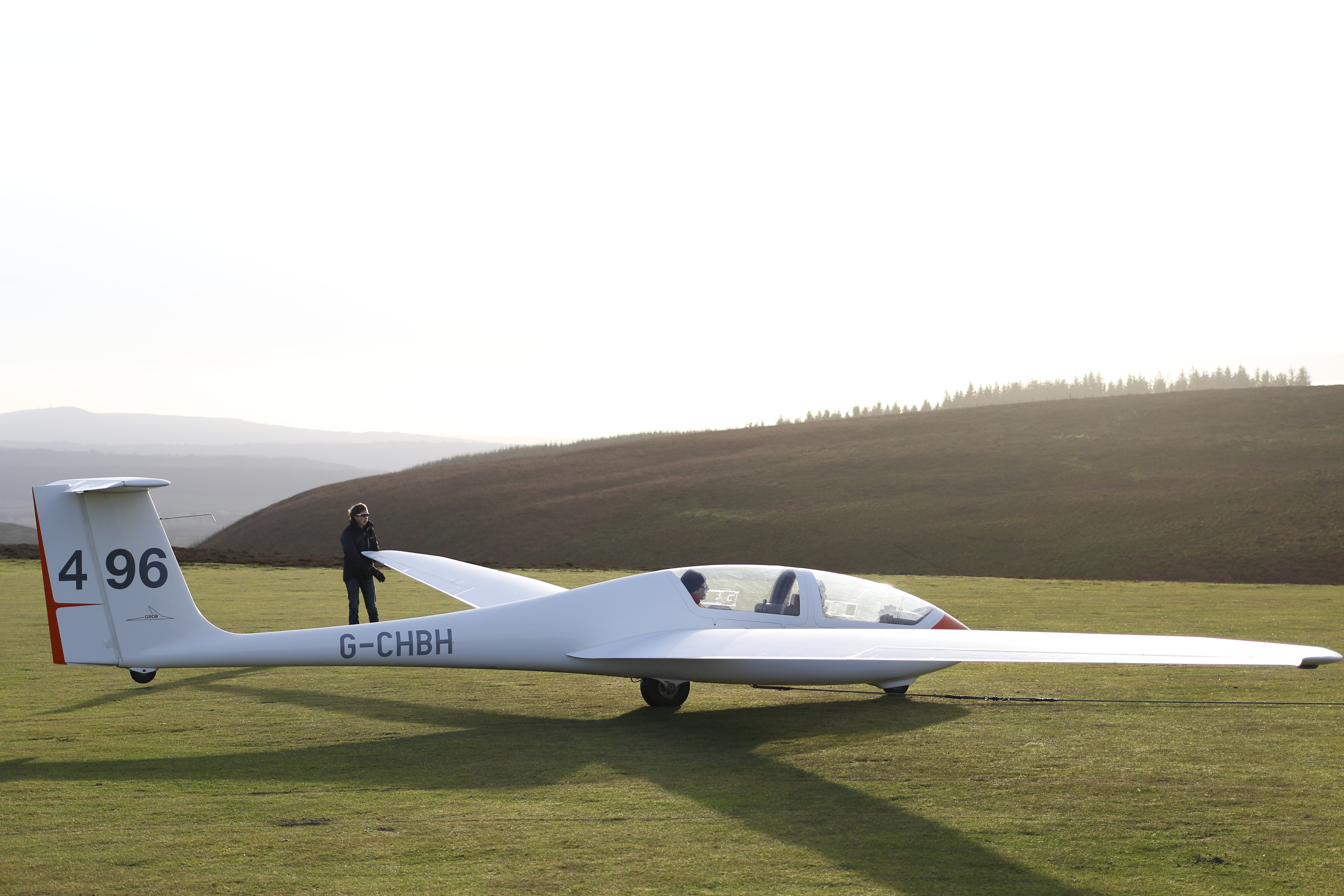
ICGC's glider 496 Grob 103

== 2Excel Engineering ==
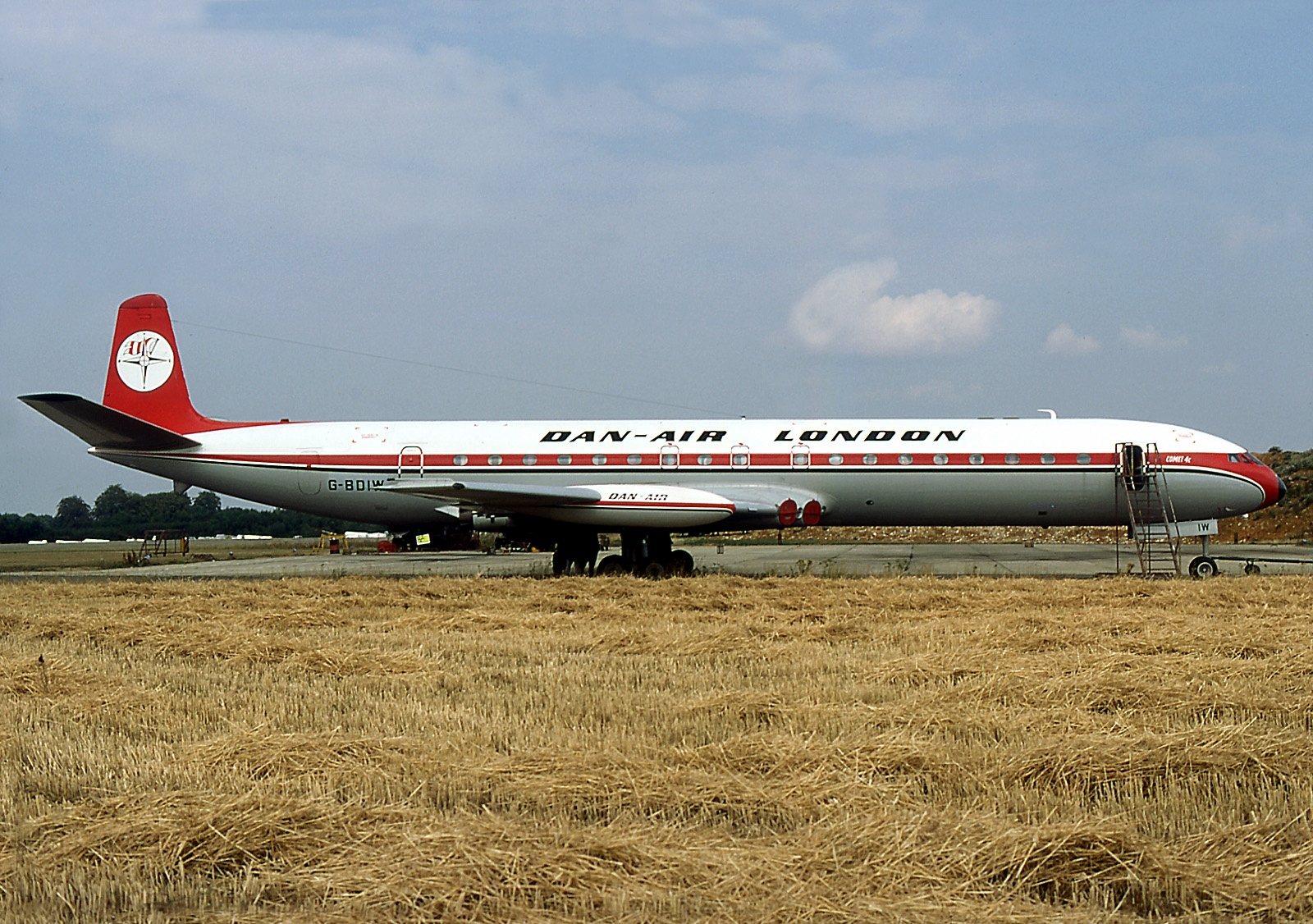
Dan-Air London's De Havilland DH 106 Comet 4C registration G-BDIW, at Lasham in July 1976

Companies based at the south-west of the airfield have used the main runway since 1954 to bring in large jet aircraft for overhauls. In 1954 Dan-Air established a subsidiary, Dan-Air Engineering, at Lasham Airfield to service its own fleet and aircraft belonging to other operators.

Between 1972 and 1974 Lasham airfield regularly hosted six Douglas DC3 Dakotas owned by Roger Byron-Collins' Macedonian Aviation based at Southend airport for care and maintenance and resprays under arrangements with Dan-Air. Regular visitors were DH104 Dove G-APZU (04511), Douglas Dakota G-AMPO (16437/33185), G-AMHJ (13468), G-AMPZ (16124/32872), G-AMRA (15290/26735), G-AMSV (16072/32820)

From the 1960s to 1980s, Lasham hosted a number of unusual aircraft – notably one of only two surviving Avro Yorks (G-ANTK in Dan-Air colours) – and was the resting home of aircraft from around the world which came to be scrapped, including most of the old Comet 4 fleet. Dan-Air ceased trading in 1992, and after a period of operation by FLS Aerospace, the facility was let by the society to aircraft maintenance company ATC Lasham Ltd.

On 2 October 2015, the holding company of ATC Lasham went into administration and closed its Southend branch with immediate effect. New owners of ATC Lasham Ltd, 2Excel Engineering Ltd, signed a new lease with the Society on 23 December 2015 and have continued to maintain large jet aircraft at Lasham.

The airfield occasionally provides storage for redundant aircraft. In 2008 these included aircraft from XL Airways UK, Futura International Airways, Zoom Airlines. Six bmibaby 737s arrived in 2012 when the airline closed. Several aircraft were parked at Lasham during the COVID-19 recession, including some from easyJet, TUI and Ryanair.
