= JPA =

JPA may refer to:

- Jacksonville Port Authority
- Jakarta Persistence API, a Java programming language API
- Jacques Potdevin et Associés, a French accounting firm and, by extension, the JPA International network.
- Japanese Poolplayers Association
- Jewish Palestinian Aramaic, a language spoken by Jews during the Classic Era
- Joint Personnel Administration
- Joint Powers Authority
- Journal of Psychoeducational Assessment
- Juice Products Association
- Juvenile Protective Association
- Public Service Department (Malaysia) (in Malay: Jabatan Perkhidmatan Awam)
