= Lorne Welch =

British engineer and glider pilot

Patrick Palles Lorne Elphinstone Welch (12 August 1916 – 15 May 1998), generally known as "Lorne Welch", was the son of Brig Gen Malcolm Hammond Edward Welch CB CMG, who was born in 1872 in Ahmednuggur, India, to Frederick Gibson Terell Welch and Mary Hawke. Lorne was born in the UK at the family home in Dorset.

Lorne was a British engineer who became a pilot of gliders and powered aircraft in the 1930s.

He joined the UK Royal Air Force at the beginning of the Second World War, and after the war became a world-famous glider pilot.

Flying over Germany in 1942 as Captain of a twin-engined Wellington bomber, his aircraft was hit by German fire and was badly damaged. He landed it in a field in the Netherlands and was captured by the Germans, becoming a prisoner of war (PoW) in the Stalag Luft prisoner camp.

Later, he tried to escape and was transferred to the camp at Colditz, where particularly aggressive Prisoners of War were locked up.

== Profession and Gliding ==
Lorne was educated at Stowe School and became an engineer and then an engine test flight observer at the Royal Aircraft Establishment, Farnborough.

He also learned to fly gliders at the London Gliding Club.

He took up powered flying, becoming an instructor in 1939.

When the war started he moved on to multi-engined aircraft and trained pilots on Wellington bombers.

Later, Air Chief Marshal Harris organised 'Thousand Bomber' raids, using every available pilot, including instructors at conversion units. Lorne was shot down over The Netherlands on his fourth raid. He landed his damaged aircraft but one of his crew men was trapped. Lorne insisted on staying with the wreckage until his crew member was rescued and could be taken to hospital (see https://www.bbc.com/history/ww2peopleswar/stories/40/a8125940.shtml)

He was sent to Stalag Luft III in Sagan, where he assisted in "The Great Escape" by building the ventilation pump and fixed links for the tunnel through which 76 prisoners later escaped.

On 12 June 1943 24 officers made another escape attempt, being escorted by two fake German guards in the "Delousing break", Welch and Flight Lieutenant Walter Morison among them.

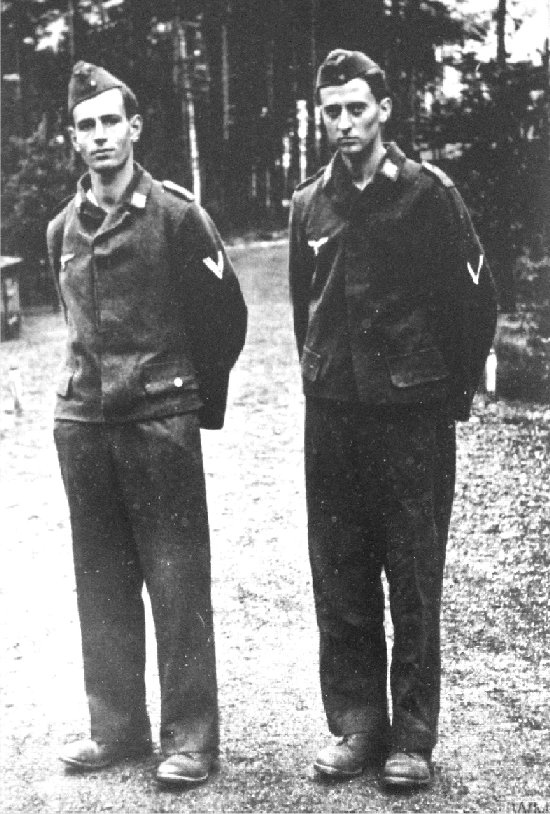
Lorne Welch and Walter Morison in 1943

This pair walked to a nearby airfield and attempted to steal a Junkers W 34 while wearing fake German uniforms (see the picture on the right, taken by the Germans after their recapture). They had to abandon the attempt when the rightful crew appeared to fly away the aircraft. The next day, they returned and tried to steal a biplane. They were recaptured, along with all the other escapees. The other 24 POWs were returned to camp, but Welch and Morison were sent to Oflag IV-C at Colditz. They were lucky not to be treated worse, because later in the war they would probably just have been shot for being found using false German uniforms.

At Colditz, the Colditz Cock glider was already under construction, and Welch performed vital stress calculations. Although the original glider never flew, a replica was successfully flown in February 2000. While at Colditz he entered a competition, sponsored by the Royal Ocean Racing Club, for prisoners of war to design an offshore yacht of 32–35 ft waterline length. Via the Red Cross, he submitted detailed drawings and calculations and won the first prize of £50.

He was liberated in 1945.

== After the War ==
Lorne returned to Farnborough to work on rocket motors.

He re-commenced gliding and became chief instructor of the Surrey Gliding Club at Redhill. The Surrey club moved to Lasham airfield, south of Basingstoke, which was further away from airliner activity than Redhill and soon became the largest gliding base in the UK with other clubs flying there as well as Surrey.

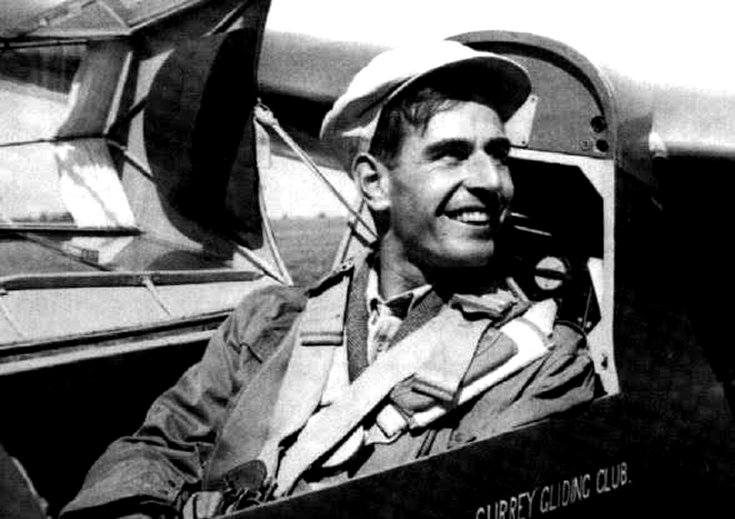
Lorne Welch in Surrey Gliding Club glider

At Lasham, Lorne became a test pilot for new aircraft for the British Gliding Association together with other Lasham pilots such as Frank Irving who was an aerodynamics tutor at Imperial College, London.

Lorne was a British team pilot in four world gliding championships.

He was the first pilot to soar a glider twice across the English Channel: first from Redhill to Brussels in a DFS 108 Weihe, and then in a two-seater glider flying from Lasham with Frank Irving.

He married Ann Douglas, also a pilot and sailor, in 1953. His retirement was spent gliding at Lasham and sailing and working on his boat.

Lorne Welch died on 15 May 1998. He was survived by his wife Ann and their daughter.
