= Kreston Reeves =

UK accountancy firm

- Native name: Kreston Reeves LLP
- Type: Private
- Industry: Financial services
- Headquarters: Canterbury, UK
- Area served: UK
- Key people: Richard Spofforth (Managing Partner)
- Services: Accountancy services, audit and assurance services, corporate financing, forensic accounting, tax services, wealth management
- Parent: AAB

Kreston Reeves is an accountancy and financial services firm based in the United Kingdom with seven offices across London and the South East of England. Since July 2026 it has been part of AAB, a professional services group operating across the UK and Ireland, and acts as the group's hub for London and the South East. The firm has 447 employees and 49 partners. It is part of the Kreston Global network and one of only a few companies in the sector to have achieved B-Corp™ certification.

Along with others in the sector, in 2025 Kreston Reeves highlighted the increased focus of the UK tax authorities on individuals earning over £200K per year.

In 2025 Accountancy Today ranked the firm 24th in the UK.

== History ==
The firm originated with the formation of Worsfold, a land, insurance and stockbrokers in Dover, by James Worsfold in 1821. This firm became Neylan & Co., which merged with Reeves & Young in 1967. In 2015 the company rebranded to Kreston Reeves.

In 2016 Kreston Reeves merged with Spofforths.

The firm merged with Munslaws in 2017.

In 2018 the firm merged with Samcorp, a corporate finance specialist.

Richard Spofforth was elected managing partner on August 1 2025, replacing Nigel Fright.

== Merger with AAB ==
In February 2026 Kreston Reeves announced that it had agreed to combine with AAB, an accountancy and professional services firm headquartered in Aberdeen which had been majority-owned by Goldman Sachs Alternatives since 2025. The transaction, which was subject to regulatory approval, completed on 1 July 2026.

The combined group has annual revenues of more than £200 million and around 1,800 employees across 23 locations in the UK and Ireland. Kreston Reeves operates as AAB's hub for London and the South East, retaining its existing offices.
