= Moore Kingston Smith =

Accountancy firm from the UK

- Company type: Limited Liability Partnership
- Industry: Professional services
- Founded: 1923
- Headquarters: London, United Kingdom
- Key people: Matthew Meadows (Managing Partner)
- Products: Charities; Education; Financial Services; Marketing Services; Media & TV; Property; Professional Firms; Technology
- Services: Accountancy & Audit; Association Management; Bookkeeping & Management Accounts; Business Tax; Charity Fundraising & Management; Company Secretarial; Controls Assurance, Risk Management & Technology Advisory; Corporate Finance; Corporate Recovery & Insolvency; Employer Services; Financial Planning; Forensic Accounting Services; Legal Services; Personal Tax; Private Client Services; Recruitment; VAT & Duty Planning
- Revenue: ▲ Uk£75.86 million (2022 accounts)
- Number of employees: 700 (2022 accounts)
- Website: Official website

Moore Kingston Smith founded in 1923 is an accountancy firm located in the United Kingdom. The firm has six offices in London and the south-east and is the London member of the Moore Global Network. In 2022, the Moore UK network ranked 11th on Accountancy Age magazine's "UK Top 50 Accountancy Firms" list.

The firm has over 75 partners and more than 700 people based in and around London, making it the largest UK member of the Moore Global Network.

The Moore Global Network consists of 34,000 people in 522 offices across 112 countries and is ranked by the International Accounting Bulletin (IAB) as the 11th largest accountancy network in the world.

== History ==
The firm was formed in 1923 as Messrs Kingston Smith & Co. with the amalgamation of Herbert Kingston and George Alan Smith.

Sir Michael Snyder joined the company as a trainee in 1968 and became Managing Partner in 1979. He played a leadership role in the company, becoming Senior Partner in 1990. He stepped down from the board in 2016, but was retained as a consultant. Martin Muirhead succeeded him as Senior Partner in 2016, while Maureen Penfold became Managing Partner.

In 1984, Kingston Smith established its investment management division, known as Cheviot Asset Management Limited. In May 2006, a team of wealth managers departed from UBS to acquire this division from Kingston Smith, which subsequently became part of Quilter, forming Quilter Cheviot.

Moore Kingston Smith was a founding member of Kingston Sorel International (KSi), which became Morison KSi in 2016, an international association of independent accountancy firms. In 2019, Moore Kingston Smith left Morison KSi and joined Moore Global. In 2021 Moore Kingston Smith acquired the Audit and Accounting business of Frank Hirth, an accountancy and tax firm.

In 2021, Martin Muirhead retired from his role as Senior Partner. Graham Tyler was appointed Chairman of the firm, alongside Maureen Penfold as Managing Partner.

In 2023, Moore Kingston Smith acquired a majority stake in Moore Ireland.
