= LEA Global =

Leading Edge Alliance: LEA Global
- Industry: Professional services
- Founded: 1999
- Headquarters: St. Charles, IL, United States
- Area served: Worldwide
- Website: LeadingEdgeAlliance.com

LEA Global (also known as the Leading Edge Alliance) is an international association of independent accounting firms that provide a range financial and business advisory services. Founded in 1999, LEA Global is ranked as the second largest accounting association in the world by the International Accounting Bulletin and as one of the top international associations by AccountingAge. At the end of 2013, aggregate revenues from LEA Global member firms was in excess of 2.9 billion US$.

== Membership ==
LEA Global does not have a policy of open membership, but requires rigorous due diligence process before inducting new members. LEA Global firms are majority independently owned and maintain individual liability for their clients. LEA Global currently has 215 member firms, with 586 offices in more than 100 countries including 2,056 partners and 23,090 staff members.
