= Black Mountains Gliding Club =

Gliding Club in Talgarth, Wales

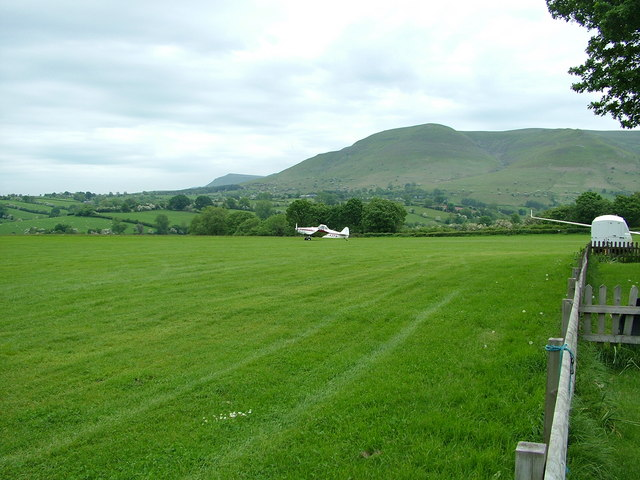
- IATA: none; ICAO: none

Summary
- Airport type: Private
- Location: Talgarth, Wales
- Elevation AMSL: 950 ft (290 m)
- Coordinates: 51.979862°N 3.206148°W
- Website: https://www.blackmountainsgliding.co.uk/

Map
- Location within Wales

The Black Mountains Gliding Club (BMGC), also known as Talgarth Gliding Club, is a members' gliding club near the town of Talgarth. It is situated 970 feet above sea level, within the Brecon Beacons National Park. The club offers a variety of gliding lessons and courses, to solo standard - and provides aerotows for those who wish to fly their own craft. The site consists of a clubhouse (including toilets, showers, a briefing room and kitchen) and two hangars - one for the club-owned gliders and the main tug (Eurofox) and the other is for the backup tug (Pawnee) and any craft that require maintenance. The surrounding, mountainous landscape allows for a variety of gliding techniques, including ridge lift and wave lift.

== History ==
The initial formation of the gliding club came after a farmer, Derrik Eckley, and amateur pilot, John Bally, came into contact in the Spring of 1978, and decided to utilise a small area of Derrik's farmland, near to the town of Talgarth. A primitive grass landing strip was leveled in an East/West direction and an Auster Tugmaster was flown in by John from Shobdon Airfield, which was the first landing at the new site. In 1979, Herefordshire Gliding Club was selling a Rallye Tug and a Blaník glider, which Derrick and John purchased - which was the club's first set of serviceable aircraft.

=== Formalisation ===
Derrick and John needed to contact the Brecon Beacons National Park (BBNP) for permission to formally utilise the site, which was initially turned down. A demonstration flight was then set up for members of the BBNP planning committee, to show that gliding would be a quiet and non-confrontational activity. Subsequently, planning permission was granted, however the club was forbidden to operate on bank holidays. Through successive appeal hearings and further demonstrations, including a low flypast of two RAF Hawk Jets in 1985 to show the difference in noise levels, a new operational plan was produced and all blockades that Derrick and John had appealed, were amended.

== Club Fleet ==
=== Gliders ===
- 4 x Schleicher ASK 13s
- 1 x Schleicher Ka 6 (privately owned, but still available for member use)
- 1 x SZD-51 Junior

=== Tow Aircraft ===
- 1 x Aeropro Eurofox 2k
- 1 x Piper PA-25 Pawnee

The Eurofox is used for regular, everyday club operation. In cases of technical defects with the aircraft, the Pawnee can be used as a backup tug, to keep the club operational. Aerotow is the only option with regards to launching - there is no winch to facilitate winch-launches.
