= Darlton Gliding Club =

Coordinates: 53°14′54″N 0°51′12″W

- Founded: June 2007
- Website: DarltonGlidingClub.co.uk

Fleet
- K13: P2
- K21: P2
- Astir: P1
- Janus: P2
- Discus: P1

Darlton Gliding Club (DGC) is a gliding club located in Nottinghamshire near the village of Tuxford.

== History ==
Darlton Gliding Club was formed during June 2007 by the merging of the former Newark and Notts Gliding Club and the Dukeries Gliding Club when both of these clubs lost use of their airfields. Darlton is now the only gliding club in the county of Nottinghamshire. The Dukeries club had been based at Gamston but when they lost the use of this site they were able to acquire the land at Darlton. Subsequently, the Newark and Notts club lost the use of their airfield at Winthorpe when the adjoining showground did not renew the lease. After a short period of ground-sharing a formal decision was made to merge the two clubs into one and the new Darlton Gliding Club was formed.

Initially there were no facilities on site – gliders were rigged and derigged each day – so the priority was to erect a hangar. A portacabin was also installed to act as a clubhouse. Much work has been put into improving the grass, and it is now able to support year round operations. Club members have since erected a second hangar and the original portacabin has been replaced with a new clubhouse which was officially opened in April 2011.

The club gained access to mains electricity on 30 September 2017 to power the clubhouse and hangars.

== Operations ==
The club is run on a non-commercial basis by the members for the members. All non-flying activities are shared on a voluntary basis.

The runway is oriented 05/23 (into the prevailing wind) and the area offers good soaring opportunities. Soaring flights have been achieved in every month from February through to November.

Most launches take place using a winch however, in late 2014, some members of the club collectively acquired a Eurofox, allowing the ability to Aerotow.

Motor glider operations are permissible and a group of members have a Falke motor glider based on the site.

== Club Fleet ==
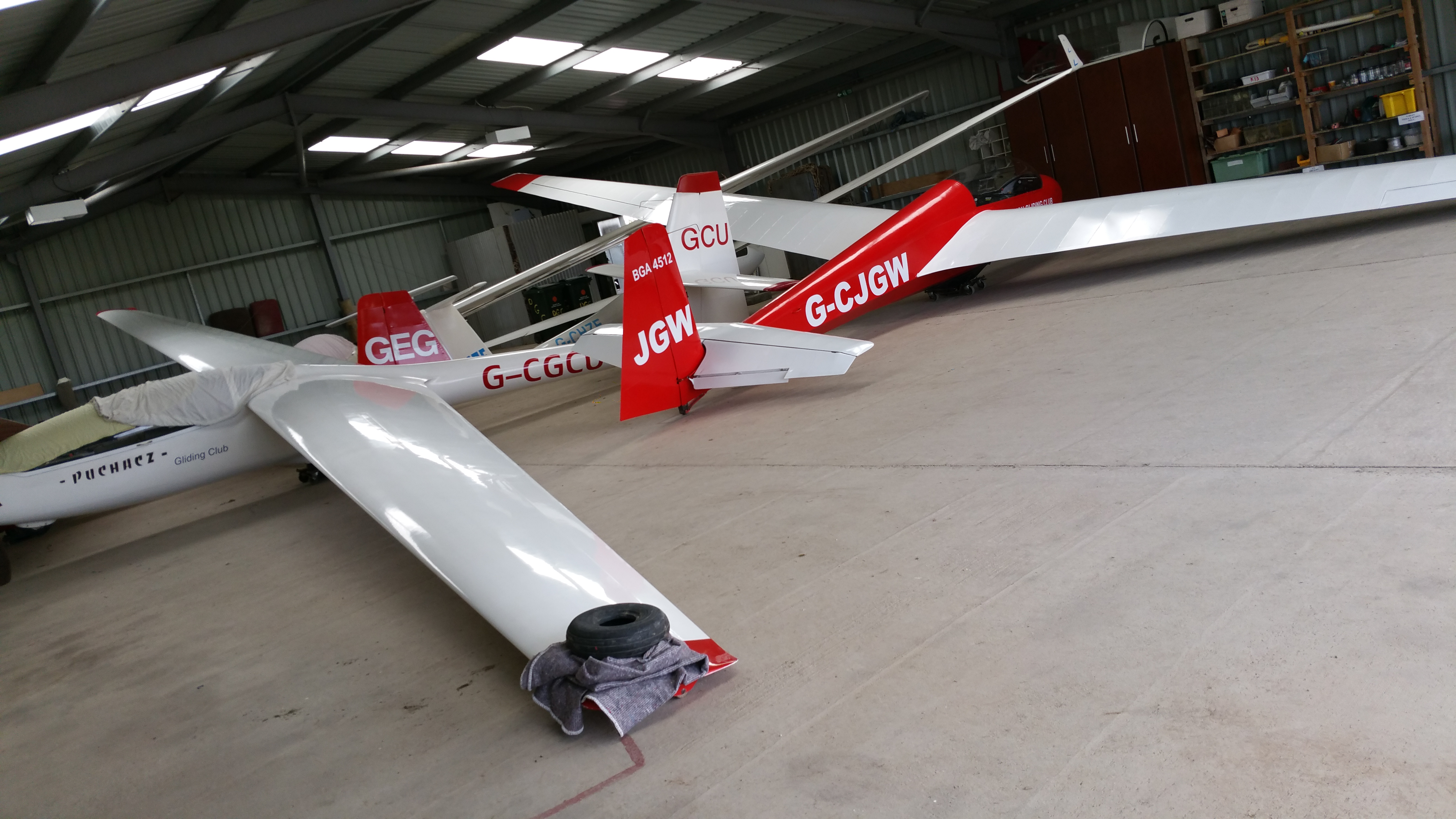
The fleet in the hangar.

The current active fleet consists of:

- K13 – Two-seat trainer
- K21 – Two-seat trainer
- Astir CS Jeans – Single-seat
- Janus – Two-seat advanced
- Discus – Single-seat advanced

== See also ==
- British Gliding Association
