= Scottish Gliding Association =

The Scottish Gliding Association is the body which represents the sport of gliding in Scotland. It represents the Scottish gliding clubs when dealing with the government of the UK, the Scottish government, local government in Scotland, and other statutory organisations. It is the main point of contact between the sport and sportscotland. However regulation and administration of the sport of gliding is still the responsibility of the British Gliding Association.

Formed in 1986, it has negotiated written agreements with the National Air Traffic Service on procedures for entering controlled airspace; negotiated with the Cairngorm Partnership; operated the ASH 25 Scottish National Gliding Facility; sponsored pilots for competitions and competition training; sponsored individuals for instructor and inspector training; sponsored FLARM ground stations (tracking suitably equipped gliders in flight for competitions, and (yet to be needed) rescue coordination – i.e. knowing where to start looking if the glider does not return after a cross-country flight). The ASH 25 was involved in an accident and was not replaced.

In addition it co-ordinates a programme of inter-club competitions to promote friendly rivalry between the Scottish gliding clubs, normally Highland & Scottish Gliding Centre one year, Cairngorm & Deeside the other year.

== History ==
Discussions about founding an association "to advance the development of the sport nationally and also to act as a governing body for Scottish gliding clubs" were first held in a Temperance cafe in Falkirk in May 1931. The convenor of the meeting said that Scottish clubs felt out of touch with one another, despite "the British Gliding Association, who normally directed their airy destinies, but in such spasmodic and distant manner as to support a legendary body". A committee was formed to approach the British Gliding Association about setting up a separate organisation. In November 1931 the nascent Scottish Gliding Association received a donation of £10 from the Comrie Gliding Club. In 1934, efforts to establish the Association were redoubled, and it was finally inaugurated under the name of the Scottish National Club, also known as the Scottish Gliding Union and the Scottish Gliding Association, with the first meeting held in Miss Buick's Tearooms in Glasgow.

The organisation's first training base was at Kelburn, near Fairlie. Two years later, in 1937, they were using a site at Gartcarron Hill, between Lennoxtown and Fintry, and had put up a hangar there. The same year the organisation became an incorporated limited company; at that meeting a speaker said that "there never was a time when it was more important for the people of this country to acquire some working knowledge of the air. There was no doubt that the sport of gliding was the best way in which that knowledge could be obtained". By 1938 the association (generally at this time known as the Scottish Gliding Union) was based at Bishop's Hill in Kinross-shire, and was setting Scottish gliding records there. The organisation's patron was Viscount Weir.

In 1955 the organisation celebrated the twenty-first anniversary of its founding, with a dinner at Kinross attended by several of the founding members. The president said that "he considered gliding one of the best methods of encouraging esprit de corps and of attracting the best types of men and women".

In 1986, the Association approached Stirling District Council with a proposal to set up a national centre of gliding at Callander. In 1989, the Association was based at the Portmoak Airfield in Kinross-shire. In 1992, the Association purchased an Ash-25 sailplane. At this time the Association had nine clubs as members, which had all put money towards the purchase, costing £100,000; they had also received a grant from the Scottish Sports Council.

== Current and former member clubs ==
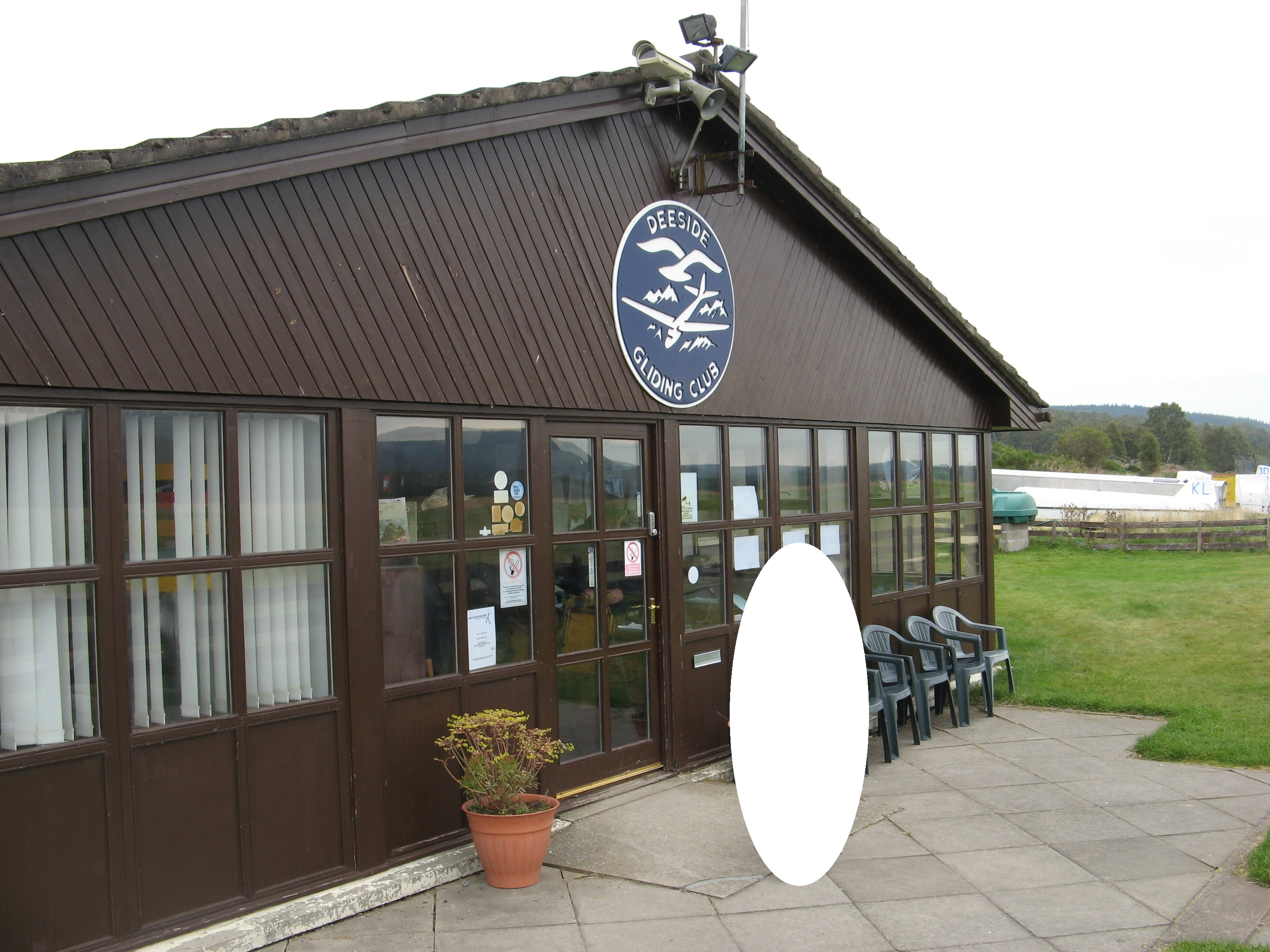
The building at the Deeside Gliding Club airfield outside Aboyne

- Angus Gliding Club (now defunct), Drumshade, Kirriemuir, Angus
- Borders Gliding Club (no longer an SGA member club), Milfield, Northumberland
- Cairngorm Gliding Club, Feshiebridge, Inverness-shire
- Deeside Gliding Club, Aboyne, Aberdeenshire
- Dumfries and Galloway Gliding Club, Falgunzeon, by Dalbeattie, Dumfries and Galloway
- Highland Gliding Club, Easterton, Birnie, Elgin, Moray
- Scottish Gliding Centre, Portmoak, Kinrossshire
- Strathclyde Gliding Club (now defunct), Strathaven, Lanarkshire
