= Forum of Firms =

International association for accounting

The Forum of Firms (FOF, Forum) is an association of international networks of accounting firms that perform transnational audits.

The objective of the Forum is to promote consistent and high-quality standards of financial reporting and auditing practices worldwide. The Forum brings together firms that perform transnational audits and involves them more closely with the activities of the International Federation of Accountants (IFAC) in audit and other assurance-related areas. It was established in 2002. Theo Vermaak is the chair of the Forum The Transnational Auditors Committee (TAC) is a committee of IFAC and the executive arm of the Forum, and, therefore, provides the official linkage between the Forum and IFAC. The Transnational Auditors Committee is chaired by Wally Gregory.

== Membership obligations ==
Members of the Forum have committed to adhere to and promote the consistent application of high-quality audit practices worldwide, as detailed in the FOF Constitution. Membership in the Forum is open to networks and firms of all sizes that conduct, or have an interest in conducting, transnational audits; promote the consistent application of high-quality audit practices and standards worldwide; support convergence of national audit standards with the International Standards on Auditing (ISAs); and commit to meeting the Forum's membership obligations.

The Forum's membership obligations require that members:

• Maintain quality control standards in accordance with the International Standard on Quality Control (ISQC 1) issued by the IAASB in addition to relevant national quality control standards;

• Conduct, to the extent not prohibited by national regulation, regular globally coordinated internal quality assurance reviews; • Have policies and methodologies for the conduct of transnational audits that are based, to the extent practicable, on the International Standards on Auditing (ISAs) issued by the IAASB; • Have policies and methodologies that conform to the IESBA Code of Ethics for Professional Accountants and national codes of ethics; and • Agree to submit to the Secretary of the Forum an annual report, in an approved format, indicating that it meets the membership obligations set forth above.

International networks of firms practicing under the same name or whose member firms are otherwise closely identified with one another, such as through common elements in their name, will be expected to join as one organization.

== Current members and affiliates ==
Members are those networks or firms that have satisfactorily submitted an annual report to the Transnational Auditors Committee (TAC) indicating that they have met the Forum's membership obligations during the reporting period. Members shall be entitled to describe themselves as such in accordance with wording to be determined by the Forum.

Members as of 2022.

- AUREN
- Baker Tilly International
- BDO
- Constantin – Serval & Associés
- Crowe Global
- Deloitte
- Ernst & Young
- FinExpertiza
- Grant Thornton International
- HLB International
- IECnet
- JPA International
- KPMG
- Kreston Global
- Kudos International
- Mazars
- MGI Worldwide
- Moore Global Network
- Nexia International
- Parker Russel International
- PKF International
- PricewaterhouseCoopers
- Reanda International
- RSM International
- RT ASEAN
- Russell Bedford International
- SW International
- Santa Fe Associates International
- SMS Latinoamérica
- Talal Abu-Ghazaleh & Co. International
- TASK International
- UHY International
