= Frank Irving =

Frank Irving (7 April 1925 – August 2005) was a British aeronautical engineer, glider pilot, author and university lecturer.

== Early life and education ==
Francis George Irving was born in Liverpool, United Kingdom. He attended St. Edward's College, and then Liverpool University.

== Aeronautics ==
Irving graduated from Liverpool University in 1944 with a First in Engineering. After graduation, he worked as a civilian flight test observer at the Aeroplane and Armament Experimental Establishment at Boscombe Down, Wiltshire. In 1945 he completed the course for civilian observers at the Empire Test Pilots School.

He began lecturing in aeronautical engineering at Imperial College London in 1947 and continued until his retirement. He was Warden of Beit Hall, a hall of residence for students of Imperial College, from 1950 to 1975.

He eventually became a Senior Lecturer in the field of performance, stability and control of aircraft. He authored An Introduction to the Longitudinal Static Stability of Low-Speed Aircraft in 1966.

Irving became a member of the Royal Aeronautical Society in 1946 and was later elected a Fellow of the Society.

== Gliding ==
Irving learned to fly gliders with the Imperial College Gliding Club. He then flew regularly in national gliding championships.

In 1955 Irving and Lorne Welch became the first pilots to cross the English Channel in a two-seat glider. They launched from Lasham in Hampshire, flew to Dover, then across the Channel to Calais, over Brussels and landed at Leuven in Belgium, a distance of 254 miles (409 km), a British record for a two-seat glider.

He was among British glider pilots who explored mountain lee waves and by 1962 he had achieved the Gold Badge with two diamonds.

Irving was Chairman of the technical committee of the British Gliding Association for 25 years.

He was also active in the Organisation Scientifique et Technique du Vol à Voile (OSTIV). He presented twenty-one technical papers at OSTIV congresses.

He developed the Irving Tube to provide glider variometers with total energy compensation so glider pilots have accurate information about the rise and fall of the air in which they are flying.

He was closely associated with development of the Sigma, a very-high-performance experimental glider.

Irving was President of the Imperial College Gliding Club from 1969 until 1999 when, at the age of 74, he chose to cease flying solo.

== Publications ==
- The Soaring Pilot (1955) with Ann and Lorne Welch
- An Introduction to the Longitudinal Static Stability of Low-Speed Aircraft (1966), Franklin Book Co, ISBN 0-08-010741-9
- The New Soaring Pilot (1968) with Ann Welch
- The Complete Soaring Pilots Handbook (1969) with Ann and Lorne Welch ISBN 978-0679507185
- The Paths of Soaring Flight (1999)
