= Imperial College Gliding Club =

- Formation: February 1930; 95 years ago
- Headquarters: Lasham Airfield
- Captain: Luca Dolt
- Website: Imperial College Gliding Club

Imperial College Gliding Club is the oldest, and one of the largest, university gliding clubs in the United Kingdom. Founded in 1930, the club was the second club to become affiliated to the British Gliding Association, and has for most of its life flown from Lasham Airfield in Hampshire. The club maintains an archive website where details of the club's history since 1930 are kept.

== See also ==
- Frank Irving
- Payne I.C.1
