= Scottish Gliding Union =

Gliding club in Scotlandwell, Scotland

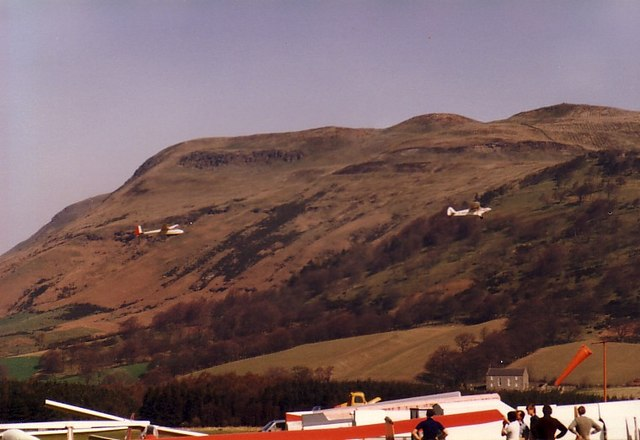
Aerotowing at Portmoak with Bishop Hill in the background

The Scottish Gliding Union (also known as the Scottish Gliding Centre) is the largest gliding club in Scotland. The body is based at Portmoak Airfield, Scotlandwell, KY13 9JJ.

== Aircraft ==
The Scottish Gliding Union's fleet currently consists of:

- 1Aeropro Eurofox tug aircraft (G-OSGC)
- 3 Schleicher ASK 21 training gliders (G-CLOV “LOV”, G-CJGJ “JGJ” and G-OWAI “WA1” owned by Walking on Air)
- 3 SZD-51 Junior single-seat gliders (G-DHHD “HHD”, G-CFFY “FFY” and G-CFUS “FUS”)
- 1 Allstar SZD-54 Perkoz glider (G-CLZS “LZS”)

== Accidents ==
=== Tug aircraft overturned during landing ===
On 21 December 2020, G-OSGC, an Aeropro Eurofox tug aircraft operated by the Scottish Gliding Union was overturned during landing after providing its 5th aerotow of the day.

The aircraft was reportedly overturned due to soft terrain which caused it to “rapidly decelerate” before becoming inverted.

There were no injuries and the aircraft has returned to service.

=== Glider crash during winch launch ===
On 4 September 2012, a Schempp-Hirth Nimbus-3 glider, G-EENN, piloted by a 49-year-old off-duty air traffic controller crashed at Portmoak Airfield during a winch-launch after the pilot did not release the launch cable during a “wing-drop”.

After the aircraft's wing touched the ground, the aircraft cartwheeled down the airfield, fatally injuring the pilot.

The British Gliding Association advises that pilots should immediately release from the launch cable if they cannot keep their aircraft's wings level.
