= Jacques Potdevin =

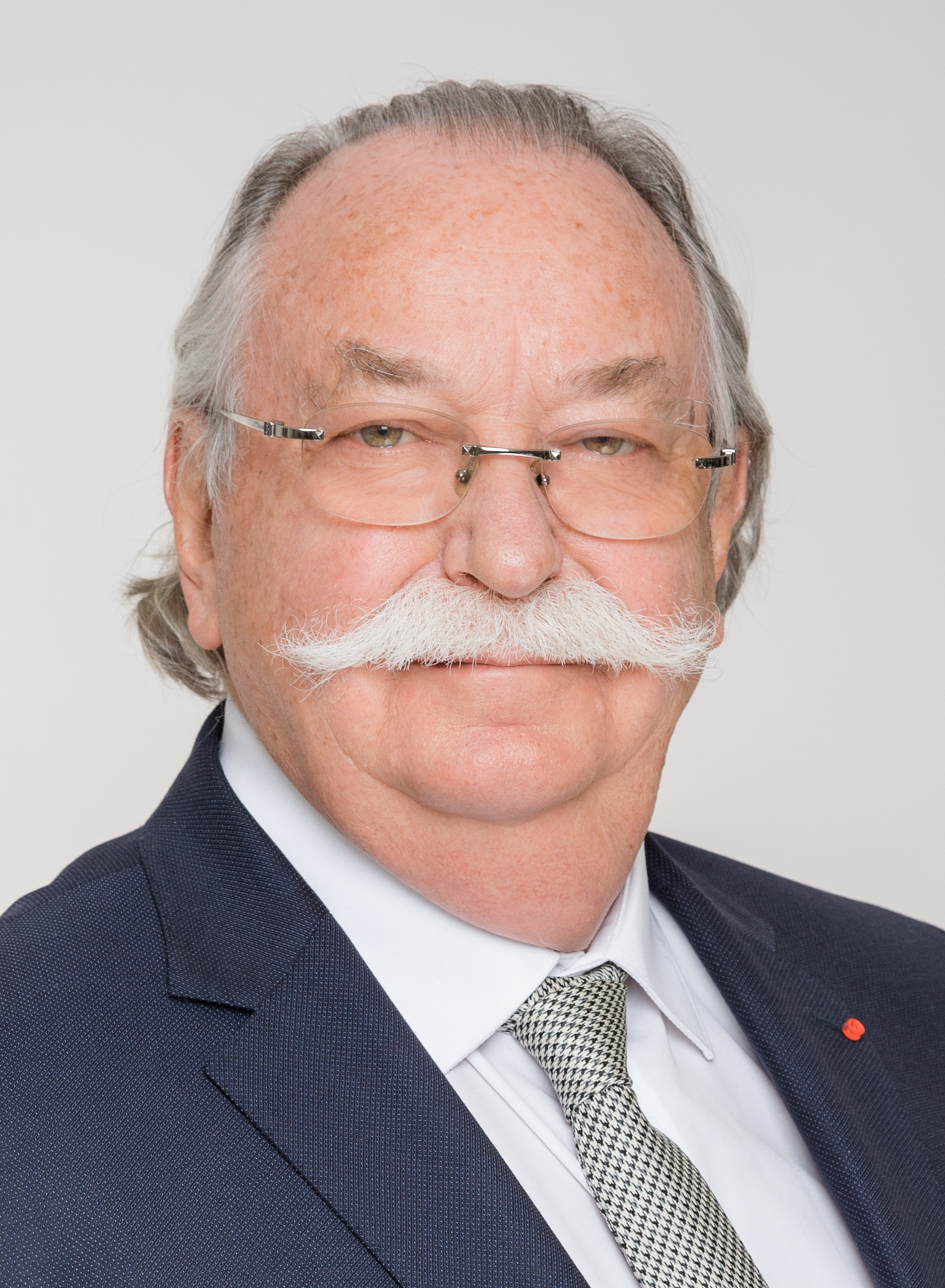
- Born: September 14, 1949 (age 76); Paris
- Occupation(s): chartered accountant, statutory auditor
- Title: Member of the IFAC nominating Committee (2015-2019) President of the IFAC Governance Committee (2013-2014) President of the Federation of European Accountants (2006-2008)

Jacques Potdevin (French pronunciation: [ʒˈak pˈə͡ʊdvɪn]), born 14 September 1949) is a French chartered accountant and statutory auditor. He is actively involved in numerous professional accounting organizations in both France and internationally.

== Biography ==
Jacques Potdevin was born in 1949 in Paris. His father, Roger Potdevin, was also a accounting professional and auditor.

In 1975, at the age of 26, Jacques Potdevin registered as a statutory auditor and obtained his chartered accountancy diploma. Shortly before this, his father died, and he had to unexpectedly take over the family firm, more quickly than anticipated. He led the firm through a period of significant growth.

Jacques Potdevin has a passion for comic books and sea voyages. He is also a patron of the Climats of Burgundy and an officer-commander in the Confrérie des Chevaliers du Tastevin.

== Commitment ==
Throughout his career, Jacques Potdevin has been committed to promoting transparency in the accounting profession and facilitating the adoption of European accounting standards in countries from the former Eastern Bloc.

A close associate of René Ricol, in 2008 he joined him in founding ADACEIP (Association for the Development of Statutory Audit Activities of Public Interest Entities), with the aim of uniting independent firms against the market dominance of the "Big Four".

== Professional career ==
=== In France ===
He has chaired the firm Jacques Potdevin and Associates (JPA) since 1975. The firm is a member of APEi, a professional association recognized by the French financial supervisory authority.

He is also a lecturer at HEC-Entrepreneurs.

=== Globally ===
In 1987, Jacques Potdevin founded JPA International, a network of chartered accounting and auditing firms present in 82 countries. JPA International ranks among the top 25 largest global accounting networks.

== Institutional activities ==
Between 1985 and 1987, he was president of the Regional Company of Statutory Auditors of Paris. From 1989 to 1991, Jacques Potdevin served as president of the National Company of Statutory Auditors (CNCC), where he actively worked to defend and promote the profession at a national level.

In parallel, Jacques Potdevin has been deeply involved with the Superior Council of the Ordre des Experts-Comptables (CSOEC), particularly leading international cooperation efforts until 2005, focusing on Eastern Europe and Southeast Asia.

He presided over the Company of Financial Advisors and Experts, directing its work toward business valuation and multidisciplinary missions from 1997 to 2001.

On a European level, Jacques Potdevin became in 1998 the French delegate to the Federation of European Accountants (FEE). He later held the positions of treasurer and president from 2006 to 2008. In this role, he worked to develop and harmonize the profession across the continent, particularly through the implementation of IFRS standards.

He was also a member of the "High-Level Group," which was tasked with making proposals for reducing administrative burdens to the European Commission from 2007 to 2013.

Jacques Potdevin has also held positions in various international organizations, such as in the International Federation of Accountants, where he promotes accounting standards and the convergence of practices globally. Since 2021, he has been a board member of the International Valuation Standards Council.

== Honours and awards ==
- Officer of the Ordre national du Mérite – 2004
- Officer of the Légion d'honneur – 2011

== Publications ==
- Potdevin, Jacques (1996). Le commissaire aux comptes. "Ce qu'il vous faut savoir" (1. éd ed.). Paris: Delmas. ISBN 978-2-247-02178-9.
