= Walter Morison =

RAF pilot (1919–2009)

Walter McDonald Morison
- Walter Morison (right) with Lorne Welch after being recaptured wearing German Luftwaffe uniforms in 1943
- Born: 26 November 1919; Beckenham, Kent, England
- Died: 26 March 2009 (aged 89)
- Military career
- Allegiance: United Kingdom
- Branch: Royal Air Force
- Service years: 1939–1945
- Rank: Flight Lieutenant
- Unit: No. 103 Squadron RAF
- Conflicts: World War II

Flight Lieutenant Walter McDonald Morison (26 November 1919 – 26 March 2009) was a Royal Air Force pilot who became a prisoner of war and was sent to Colditz for attempting to steal an enemy aircraft during the Second World War.

== Early life ==
He was born at Beckenham, Kent. While in his first year at Trinity College, Cambridge, the Second World War began; he volunteered the same day.

== Royal Air Force service ==
Morison was a glider pilot) who joined the Royal Air Force at the outbreak of war in September 1939, and was trained as a power pilot.

He was commissioned as a pilot officer on 30 November 1940 and assigned to No. 241 Squadron, flying Westland Lysanders. Because of his previous flying experience he was transferred to a training unit as an instructor. Later, in May 1942 he was posted to No. 103 Squadron flying Wellington bombers.

On the night of 5/6 June 1942 on his third mission and the first as captain, he was hit by another Wellington X3339 from 156 Squadron, piloted by Sgt Guy Chamberlin RAFVR. He was the sole survivor of his five-man crew. Coincidentally, Morison had been Chamberlin's instructor at RAF Lossiemouth around the beginning of 1942. All the crew of X3339 were killed and are buried in the same row at the Reischwald Forest War Cemetery near Kleve in Germany.

He became a prisoner of war (POW) and was sent to Stalag Luft III at Sagan. He was promoted to flight lieutenant on 30 November 1942 whilst being held as a POW.

On 12 June 1943, Morison and 23 or 25 others escaped from the camp during a delousing break. Twenty-two prisoners left the camp with two "guards", actually two fellow POWs in bogus German uniforms. Once outside, the group split up. The others were quickly recaptured, but he and Flight Lieutenant Lorne Welch, wearing fake uniforms, walked to a nearby airfield and attempted to steal an aircraft, a Junkers W 34. They had to abandon the attempt when the rightful crew appeared to fly away the aircraft. The next day, they returned and tried to steal a biplane, but were caught and eventually sent to Oflag IV-C at Colditz.

He was liberated from Colditz by the American army in April 1945.

== Post-war ==
Following the war, Morison qualified as a chartered accountant at the Institute of Chartered Accountants in England & Wales. He was articled at Morison, a firm established by his great uncle. Morison then worked at Coopers Bros, the firm that became Coopers & Lybrand, before returning to his family firm, Morison Stoneham. He led the firm as a senior partner through a period of great change from 1960 to 1981 before retiring. Whilst Morison Stoneham was acquired by Tenon (later known as RSM Tenon) one of his legacies that still exists today is Morison International a global association of professional service firms (accountants, auditors, tax and business advisers).

He wrote an account of his life during the war, Flak and Ferrets - One Way to Colditz.

Morison died on 26 March 2009.
