= Kreston Global =

Network of accountancy and financial services firms worldwide

- Native name: Kreston International Ltd.
- Type: Private
- Industry: Financial services
- Founded: 1971; 55 years ago in London
- Founder: Gabriel Brösztl, Michael Ross
- Headquarters: London, UK
- Area served: Worldwide
- Services: Accountancy services, advisory, audit and assurance services, outsourcing services, tax services and indirect taxes

Kreston Global is a network of 155+ accountancy and financial services firms worldwide ranked the thirteenth largest network of accounting, auditing, and consulting firms in the world by the International Accounting Bulletin’s annual rankings survey.

== History ==
Kreston Global was formed in London in 1971 by two entrepreneurs, Gabriel Brösztl and Michael Ross when the German firm BANSBACH GmbH (at the time led by Gabriel Brösztl) formed a relationship with the UK firm Finnie.

The first member firm, Groupe Fiduciaire Kreston in Paris, was added shortly after. In 1981 Kreston Global had six firms in UK, Netherlands, West Germany, Denmark, France and Sweden.

By 1991, the group expanded and established a formal structure. In 2000, after serving as Chairman of Kreston for 29 years, Dr Gabriel Brösztl stood down.

In 2001, the Group expanded its operations to mainland China. Clive Stevens, Chairman of Kreston Reeves UK, began serving as Kreston Chairman, a role which he held until 2012.

In 2008, Exco France, a network of 23 independent firms, located throughout France, and its correspondent members in 11 French-speaking African countries joined Kreston Group. The group also added additional locations in Poland, West Indies, New Caledonia and Reunion. That same year, Costa Rica was added to Kreston's Central America group which also included El Salvador, Guatemala, Honduras and Nicaragua. In 2011, Kreston was named a full member of the Forum of Firms. In 2012, Franck Parker, CEO of Exco France, took up the role of Kreston International Chairman. Also in 2012, the Kreston Academies Benchmark UK Report was launched, Kreston's joint annual publication that assesses the finances of 1,400 academy schools in 300 academy trusts.

In 2015, firms in the major markets of the UK (Kreston Reeves and James Cowper Kreston), Germany and the Netherlands joined Kreston. In 2016–2018, new member firms in South-East Asia, Middle East, Europe and Africa joined the Kreston Group. In 2022, new firms in Saudi Arabia, Kuwait, and Bahrain, among others, joined the Group. The following year, Kreston Pedabo in Nigeria joined the group. In 2025, Kreston Global opened a new office in Luanda, Angola. In the same year, new firms in Jordan and in the Eastern Caribbean joined the network.

In June 2026, Armenia-based LL Consulting joined the network and began operating as Kreston Armenia. Later that month, SFAI Kazakhstan joined the network and began operating as Kreston Kazakhstan. In August, Lithuania-based RCM Advisors joined the network and began operating as Kreston RCM.

== Operations ==
Kreston Global's network includes 155+ independent accounting firms in 110+ countries, with 800+ offices and over 30,000+ people employed. Each Kreston Global member is an independent practice with sole responsibility for its own work, staff and clients. The company is headquartered in London.

In 2024, Kreston Global CEO Liza Robbins discussed the findings of the network's Interpreneur report on international business expansion and the factors influencing investment in the United Kingdom.

In March 2025, Kreston Global appointed David Smith as Director of Quality and Professional Standards and Sharon Omer-Kaye as chair of its Global Private Client Services Group. In February 2026, Jan Slagter was appointed chair of the Kreston Global Indirect Tax Group.

In 2026, Kreston Global-affiliated professionals were featured in coverage of international business and tax issues, including grain transport costs, transfer pricing compliance, the OECD's Side-by-Side package for global minimum tax, and blockchain's implications for accounting.

In March 2026, Kreston Global reported that total network revenues had increased by 39% to $4.3 billion, with growth across all major regions. In April 2026, Kreston Global launched a Global Legal Group to coordinate legal services across its network, working alongside the Global Tax Group, and appointed Tyna Adediran as chair of its Global Advisory Services Group, succeeding Ricardo Gameroff.
