= INPACT =

International group of accounting firms

INPACT Global
- Type: Association of accounting firms
- Industry: Accounting
- Founded: 1989; 37 years ago
- Headquarters: Regional Executive Offices in the UK, USA and Hong Kong
- Products: Accounting; Audit; Tax; Consulting; Insolvency; Corporate finance
- Revenue: USD$340 million(2022)
- Website: www.inpactglobal.org

INPACT Global is an international group of accounting firms that provide audit, accountancy, tax, business restructuring and insolvency, corporate finance and consulting services. The alliance was established in 1989 and INPACT International together with sister alliances INPACT Americas and INPACT Asia Pacific, forms INPACT Global. Together the alliances comprise over 140 member firms in some 250 locations in more than 70 countries.

INPACT Global's legal status as an association is in accordance with the International Federation of Accountants (IFAC) audit code. As of 2022, INPACT Global was ranked by the International Accounting Bulletin as the 14th largest association of accounting firms in the world. At the end of 2022, the aggregated revenues of all INPACT Global member firms totalled approximately USD340 million.

INPACT Global is one of 24 members of the European Group of International Accounting Networks & Associations (EGIAN)

== History ==
In 1989 INPACT International was founded as the International Network of Professional Accountants which was abbreviated to INPACT.

In 1995 an agreement was signed with CPA Management Systems, Inc. to form the organization's North American sister alliance INPACT Americas. In 1998 a similar agreement was signed with APACT in Hong Kong to form the organization's Asia Pacific sister alliance INPACT Asia Pacific.

In March 2013, at the International Accounting Bulletin (IAB) Awards, INPACT Global was selected as a Finalist in the "International Accounting Association of the Year" category.

In September 2014, at the International Accounting Bulletin (IAB) Awards, the INPACT Global won the Highly Commended award in the "International Accounting Association of the Year" category.

In October 2015, at the International Accounting Bulletin (IAB) Awards, the INPACT Global won the "Global Rising Star Association of the Year" award.

== Chairs/President by region ==
=== Europe, Middle East, Africa and Central South American ===
Name	Dates
Jean-Philippe Gioanni	2022 - Current
Marcelo Berge	2020 - 2022
Ralf Zeiss	2017 - 2020
Lena Fiedler	2014 - 2017
Stephen Jacobs	2011 - 2014

=== Asia Pacific ===
Name	Dates
Arun Srinivasan	2020 - Current
Chan Siew Wei	2015 - 2020

=== North American ===
Name	Dates
Bruce Levine	2017 - 2019
Kevin Hessler	2015 - 2017
Reynold Cicalese	2011 - 2015
