= Delousing break =

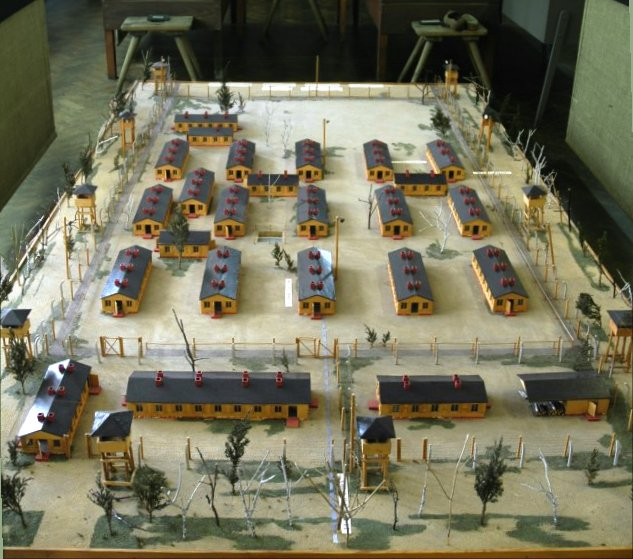
Model of the set used to film the movie The Great Escape. It depicts a smaller version of a single compound in Stalag Luft III. The model is now at the museum near where the prison camp was located.

The Delousing break was a mass escape attempt by Allied aircrew officers of British and American nationalities who were held as prisoners of war during the Second World War. It occurred on 12 June 1943 from the North Compound of Stalag Luft III Prisoner of War Camp in Germany.

== Main Party ==
The plan was masterminded by Squadron Leader Roger Bushell RAF, who also organized the Great Escape from the same camp.

Twenty-four officers, escorted by two fake guards (Allied POWs disguised as Germans), left the camp through the main gate to proceed to the neighbouring compound to be deloused. All twenty-six escapees were recaptured, many within hours. Twenty-four of them were returned to the camp, but Flight Lieutenant Lorne Welch and Pilot Officer Walter Morison were sent to Oflag IV-C at Colditz for attempting to steal an aircraft. Flying Officer Henry Birkland RCAF and Flight Lieutenant John Stower also took part in this escape attempt; both were later murdered following the Great Escape in March 1944.

== Second Party ==
A second party of six officers, again escorted by a fake guard (Flight Lieutenant Bram van der Stok), also attempted to escape whilst en route to the neighbouring compound shortly after the main party had left, however, the forged pass carried by Van der Stok was out-dated, and the alarm was raised. This party included RAF fighter ace Wing Commander Robert Stanford Tuck. All participants in the escape were held for a period of time in solitary confinement.
