= HLB International =

British accounting firm

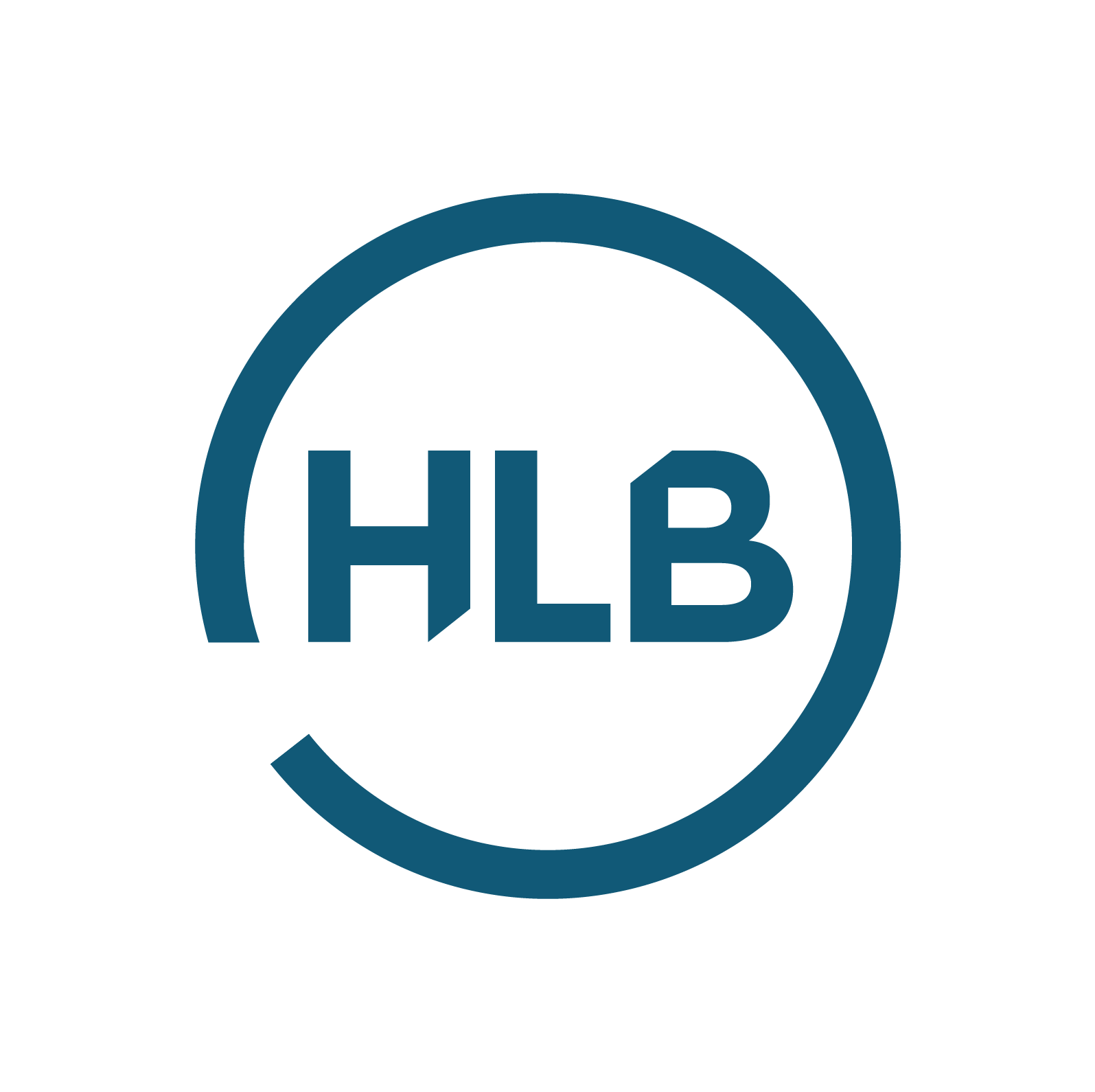
- Type: Network of independent firms
- Industry: Professional Services
- Founded: 1969; 57 years ago
- Headquarters: Head Office in London, UK
- Products: Accounting, audit, tax, consulting
- Revenue: $6.67 billion USD (2025)
- Number of employees: 55,538 (2025)
- Website: www.hlb.global

HLB International is a global network of independent advisory and accounting firms, comprising member firms in 155 countries. HLB International member firms offer audit, accounting, tax and business advisory services.

HLB International is a leading mid-tier accounting network. As of January 2025 the network has a total worldwide revenue of US $6.67 billion. HLB International is a member of the Forum of Firms.

== History ==
The network was formed in 1969. The current name was derived from Hodgson Landau Brands, which was based on some of the early members: Hodgson Harris, founded in 1877 by Robert Hodgson (UK), Mann Judd Landau, founded in 1926 as Fred Landau & Co by Fred Landau, (US) and Brands & Wolff (Netherlands). In the course of time, these three names all disappeared through mergers, and the network shortened its name to HLB International in 1990.

== Membership ==
HLB is represented in 155 countries on five continents. Collectively, member firms have 55,538 partners and staff in 1,398 offices worldwide.

=== United Kingdom ===
The founder firm in the United Kingdom, Fuller Jenks Beecroft & Co, merged with Mann Judd in 1975 and then left this network to join Touche Ross, which is now Deloitte. (In Australia and New Zealand, some firms with the name Mann Judd remain members of HLB.)

Hodgson Harris succeeded Mann Judd as the UK member, contributing the name Hodgson to HLB. By successive mergers this UK firm became Hodgson Impey, then Kidsons Impey, and was finally known as HLB Kidsons before leaving the network for Baker Tilly in London (not to be confused with Baker Tilly International) in 2002.

HLB then invited the listed company Numerica, an accountancy consolidator, to become its UK member. In 2005 Numerica, in financial difficulty, was mostly taken over by another listed consolidator, Vantis, which replaced it as the UK member of HLB. At the end of June 2010, Vantis also foundered, and was broken up.

Having been dependent for several years on the expansion plans of a public company, the network instead built a federation of local partnerships by the end of 2010, following its model in the US and elsewhere. Menzies (ranked 23rd in the UK), Hazlewoods (41st) and Lovewell Blake LLP (44th) joined HLB from accounting network Praxity, followed by Hawsons, Beever and Struthers, and French Duncan.

== Management and governance ==
In April 2017, COO Marco Donzelli succeeded Rob Tautges as Chief Executive.

In February 2010, Minnesota partner Rob Tautges succeeded Peter Frost as Chief Executive.

Other managing and governing bodies are the Council, the Chairman, and the Executive Committee.

There are also several Technical Committees. The three main international committees relate to advisory, tax, and audit & financial reporting.

The Executive Office is based in London.

== Corporate and social responsibility ==
=== HLB Sustainability Programme ===
HLB member firms are committed to community outreach and "green" initiatives, based on both volunteer efforts and fundraising. Initiatives have so far been taken in various countries including Australia, Austria, Denmark, France, Germany, Japan, Spain, the United Kingdom, United Arab Emirates and the United States.

=== Women in Accounting - HLB WinA ===
HLB International recognises that retaining and promoting top talent can be particularly difficult where female staff members are concerned. The Women in Accounting initiative is aimed at sharing knowledge of best practice in order to assist member firms in attracting and retaining talented staff.
