= Morison Global =

Professional service firm association

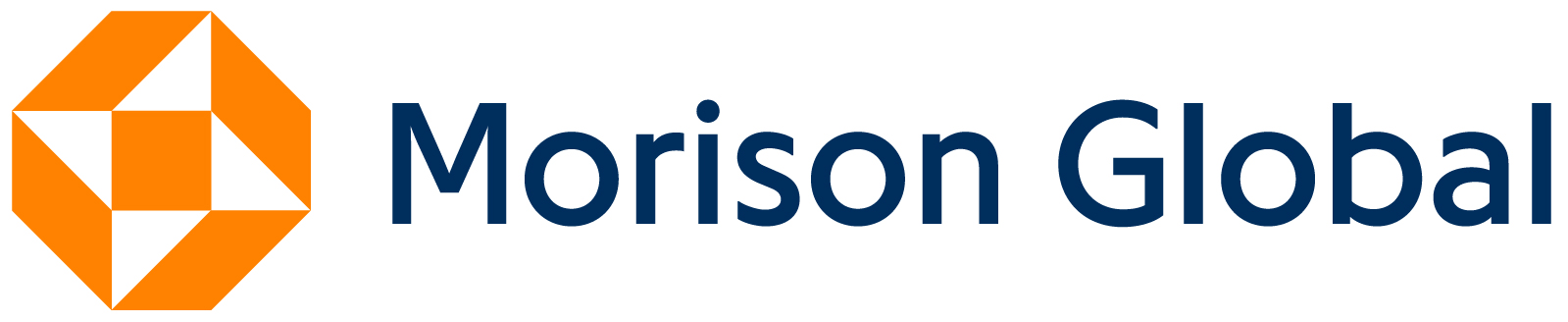
- Company type: Association of independent firms
- Industry: Accounting; Audit; Professional Services; Tax; Consulting
- Founded: 1923 as Kingston Smith; 1924 as Cabinet Sorel; 1990 as Morison International and KS International
- Founders: Walter Morison, Herbert Kingston, Albert Sorel and George Alan Smith
- Headquarters: Global Executive Office in London
- Revenue: USD$742m (2025)
- Website: www.morisonglobal.com

Morison Global (previously Morison KSi) is a global association of professional service firms (accounting, auditing, tax and business consulting). The association has 110 member firms in more than 65 countries. Morison Global's status as an association is in accordance with the International Federation of Accountants (IFAC) audit code and the EU Statutory Audit Directive 2006/43/(EC) (“the 8th Directive”). Morison Global is ranked by the International Accounting Bulletin as the 10th largest accounting association in the world. In January 2025, the combined revenue of all member firms was USD742m.

== History ==
Morison Global was formed in 2016 from a merger of two organisations Morison International and KS International.

Both associations were established after the same ICAEW (Institute of Chartered Accountants in England and Wales) dinner in 1990 organised for French and UK accounting firms to forge links. Aplitec met Morison Stoneham who went on to form Morison International and Kingston Smith met Cabinet Sorel who went on to form KS International.

== Morison International ==
The association is the legacy of Walter Morison (26 November 1919 – 26 March 2009) a Royal Air Force pilot who became a prisoner of war and was sent to Colditz for attempting to steal an enemy aircraft during the Second World War.

Following the war, Morison qualified as a chartered accountant at the Institute of Chartered Accountants in England & Wales. He was articled at Morison Stoneham, a firm established by his great uncle. Morison then worked at Coopers Bros, the firm that became Coopers & Lybrand, before returning to his family firm, Morison Stoneham. He led the firm as a senior partner through a period of great change from 1960 to 1981 before retiring. Morison Stoneham was the founding firm of Morison International.

== Corporate Governance ==
Morison Global is run under the direction of an international Board with 5 sub-regional Boards – Africa, Asia Pacific, Europe, Latin America and North America. Its CEO is Ryan Piper.

== See also ==
- Accountancy
- Audit
- International Standards on Auditing
