= Payne I.C.1 =

British single-seat glider, 1930, not flown

General information
- Type: Primary glider
- Manufacturer: Imperial College Gliding Club
- Designer: J. H. Payne
- Number built: 1

History
- First flight: Probably never flown

The Payne I.C.1 was a primary glider built by members of a university gliding club in 1930. It was finished and prepared for flight but was damaged by wind and repairs were never completed.

== Design and development ==
When the Imperial College Gliding Club was formed in February 1930, it had no gliders and therefore decided to build its own. This was designed by J. H. Payne and built by students, with materials donated by the Rector, Sir Henry Tizard. Parts were made in the Chemistry and Glass workshop of the college and the glider was assembled in Payne's garden. Named The Incredible, the I.C.1 was completed during the club's summer camp at Gore Farm, near Shaftesbury, in September 1930. (Note: Ellison has the date as 1931, but the Imperial College records seem to refute this.)

The I.C.1 had a straight, constant chord, thick section wing built around two spruce box spars with plywood webs. The I-section ribs were also made from spruce and ply, the leading edge from ply and the trailing edge form dural. It had outboard ailerons but neither flaps nor airbrakes. The fuselage was an open frame structure with two horizontal, parallel booms that ran rearwards from the wing spars to the tail, where two cross braces carried the tailplane. A pair of N-form struts converged below the wing onto a third boom, horizontal below the wing then angled upwards to the tail, joining the rear cross brace via a short vertical member and two angled ones. The three long booms formed a triangular section girder that did not require further wire bracing.

The pilot's seat and control column were mounted, unenclosed, on the lower beam ahead on the wing; below him a shallow, curved member served as a keel for landing. The lower beam also provided an attachment point for lift wires, one on each side, to the forward wing spar. Above the wing two further pairs of wires ran from a central, three strut cabane to both spars. The tail surfaces were straight edged and the fin small, its leading edge formed by a sloping member that joined the forward transverse member at the front of the tailplane to the lower fuselage beam. The rudder extended to the lower fuselage.

== Operational history ==
During preparation for its first flight, the Incredible was overturned by a gust of wind and damaged. It was stored at Gore Farm and repair work was begun in the 1931 Easter vacation but never completed and the SC.1 never flew. In December 1930 the club had bought a R.F.D. Primary (Dagling), a steel framed version of the German Zogling, which they designated I.C.II and were soon flying regularly.

== Specifications ==
Data from British Gliders and Sailplanes 1922-1970

General characteristics

- Capacity: 1
- Length: 19 ft 5 in (5.92 m)
- Wingspan: 36 ft 0 in (10.97 m)
- Height: 7 ft 6 in (2.29 m)
- Wing area: 179 sq ft (16.6 m^{2})
- Aspect ratio: 7.2
- Airfoil: Probably Bairstow Aerofoil B
- Empty weight: 190 lb (86 kg)
