= International Accounting Bulletin =

- International Accounting Bulletin logo
- Editor: Zoya Malik
- Former editors: Vincent Huck, Jonathan Minter
- Staff writers: Joe Pickard, Sarajuddin Isar
- Categories: Accounting Magazine
- Frequency: Monthly
- First issue: 1983
- Company: Progressive Digital Media
- Country: United Kingdom
- Based in: London
- Language: English
- Website: www.internationalaccountingbulletin.com

International Accounting Bulletin (IAB) is a monthly accountancy trade magazine that covers the global accounting business.

== History ==
International Accounting Bulletin was first launched in 1983 as a newsletter by Michael Lafferty of the UK publisher Lafferty Group.

In 2004 the newsletter was sold to UK media company VRL Knowledgebank in a deal that also included sister publication The Accountant.

In 2012 VRL Financial News was bought by Progressive Digital Media.

Today, the magazine is produced by an editorial team of four people in London, with correspondents in Singapore, India, Canada, Mexico and Brussels.

== Coverage ==
Targeted at accounting firms, networks and associations, IAB provides data, news and analysis on mergers and acquisitions, leadership changes, network additions, strategy, financial results, lawsuits, regulation and compliance issues. International Accounting Bulletin is read by C-Level executives, in particular accounting firm leaders and strategists.

== Research ==
Each month the International Accounting Bulletin publishes Country Surveys on accounting firms. These surveys feature in-depth analysis of the leading firms, networks and associations with data on fee income, business line fee split, staff data and contact information. At the beginning of each year, the International Accounting Bulletin launches a World Survey that ranks the leading 40 accounting networks and associations.

=== 2013 surveys ===
Country: United States, Canada, China, Spain, Poland, Italy, Turkey, Netherlands, Germany, France, South Korea, Mexico, India, Australia, Russia, South Africa, Brazil, Japan, United Kingdom, Africa, Latin America, World

== Events ==
Each year the International Accounting Bulletin hosts an event to launch its annual World Survey, which was attended by industry leaders from various accounting firms, including Grant Thornton, INPACT, Morison International, RSM International, PwC, KPMG, EY, HLB International, BKR International, Deloitte and BDO.
