= Juice Products Association =

American trade group

- Abbreviation: JPA
- Predecessor: National Association of Citrus Juice Processors
- Formation: 2003; 23 years ago
- Merger of: National Juice Products Association and Processed Apples Institute
- Type: Nonprofit trade association
- Legal status: 501(c) organization
- Purpose: Advocate for the fruit and juice products industry
- Location: Washington, DC, United States
- Region served: United States
- Services: Advocacy
- Members: 31 Members 24 associate members (2025)
- President: Jeannie Milewski
- Funding: Membership fees
- Website: juiceproducts.org

The Juice Products Association (JPA) is an American industry trade group that representing the juice processing industry in the United States. The association claims a membership of "over 130 regular and associate member organizations, representing juice and fruit processing companies and support industries throughout the United States and overseas."

== History ==
The Juice Products Association traces its lineage to the founding of the National Association of Citrus Juice Processors in Florida in 1957. It later expanded from only the citrus juice industry to include other projects, including grapes, apples, pears, and tomatoes.

The National Juice Products Association and Processed Apples Institute merged in 2003 to form the Juice Products Association. In early 2005, the International Jelly and Preserve Association and the Concord Grape Association merged into the Juice Products Association, forming the Fruit Spread Section and Concord Grape Section of the JPA umbrella.

Around 2015, JPA members became concerned that juice as a healthy option could be challenged by upcoming USDA Dietary Guidelines for Americans. In response, JPA created a research panel of experts and advocated for juice as a healthy option. The 2015-2020 guidelines included juice as a healthy, nutritious component for meeting daily values of fruit consumption.
