= British Gliding Association =

Gliding Association

- Sport: Gliding
- Jurisdiction: United Kingdom
- Membership: 72 gliding clubs
- Abbreviation: BGA
- Founded: 1929
- Affiliation: Fédération Aéronautique Internationale
- Regional affiliation: Royal Aero Club
- Headquarters: Leicester, United Kingdom
- Chairman: George Metcalfe
- CEO: Pete Stratten

Official website
- www.gliding.co.uk
- (United Kingdom)

The British Gliding Association (BGA) is the governing body for gliding in the United Kingdom. Gliding in the United Kingdom operates through 72 gliding clubs (both civilian and service) which have 2,310 gliders and 9,462 full flying members (including service personnel), though a further 17,000 people have gliding air-experience flights each year.

== History ==
A gliding event first occurred in the UK on a hill at Itford in East Sussex in 1922. The meeting was largely a publicity stunt by the Daily Mail newspaper which had offered a prize of one thousand pounds for the longest flight. However little gliding happened in the UK for several years after until reports of long flights in thunderstorms in Germany appeared in The Aeroplane magazine. Douglas Culver suggested a lunch meeting at the Comedy Restaurant in London on 4 December 1929 for anybody who was interested. Fifty-six people attended and a committee was formed. Shortly after the BGA was founded to start the sport of gliding in the UK. Clubs were soon established throughout the country, many of which disappeared just as quickly, though some still remain today. Initially the BGA had individual members and funded some clubs, but it soon changed to being an association of the clubs with no individual members. Today the clubs pay an annual subscription to the BGA on behalf of their members. The patron of the BGA was Prince Philip who was introduced to the sport by a former chairman, Peter Scott.

== Role ==
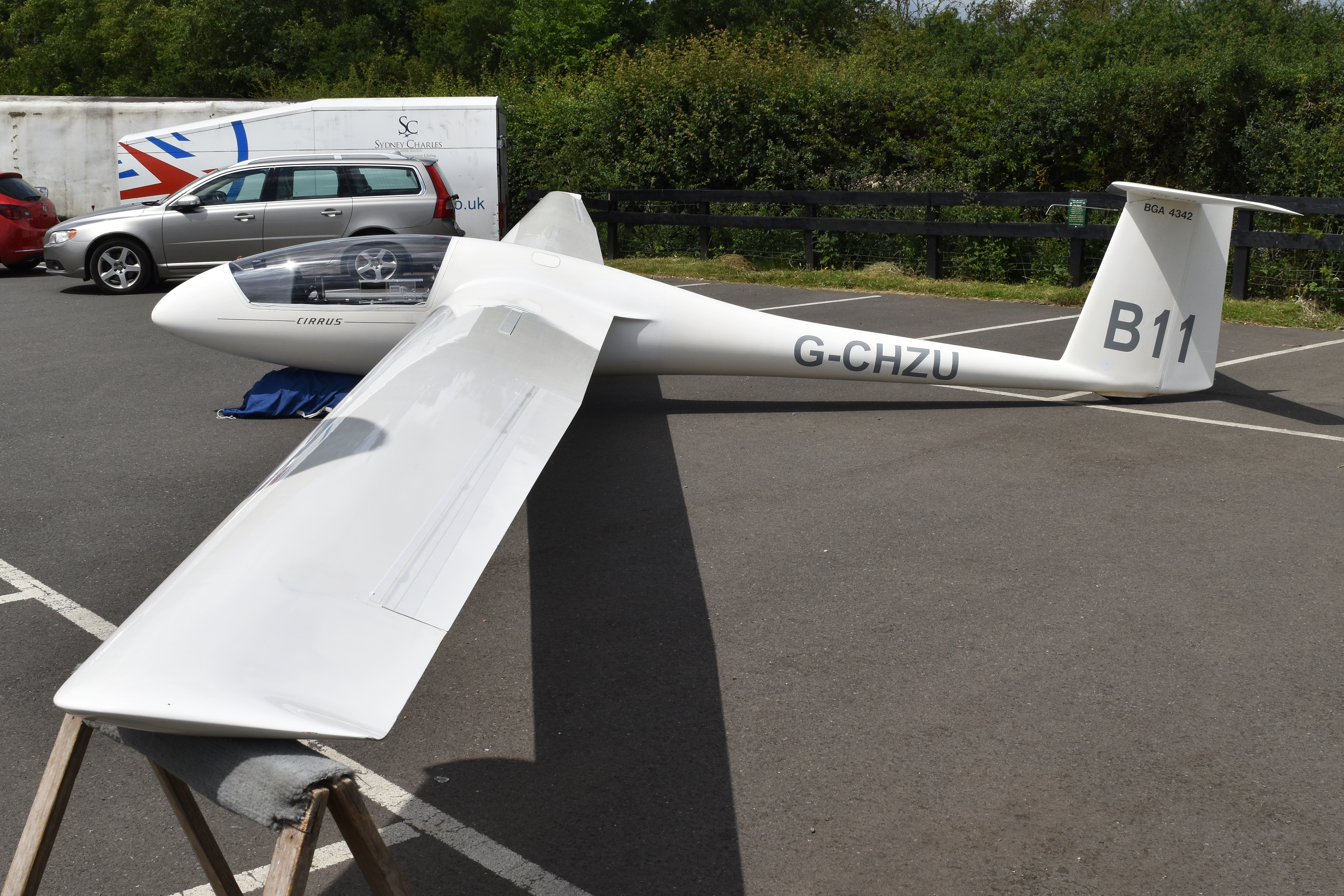
Schempp-Hirth Standard Cirrus Glider BGA competition number shown on fin

When the BGA was formed, it assumed responsibility for British gliding and the British government has not seen the need to change a system of self-regulation, because it has been effective and economical. As a result, the BGA still has the authority that it assumed to manage most aspects of gliding in the UK. Instructors and pilots are trained to BGA standards; annual inspections of gliders are done by engineers authorised by the BGA, whose qualifications are accepted by the Civil Aviation Authority (CAA); and minor accidents are investigated by the BGA alone. Since September 2008 all gliders have a full CAA registration and airworthiness checks to EASA standards, except for a number of mainly vintage and one-off types which remain under BGA control.

British glider pilots did not need a glider pilot licence awarded by the CAA until 2018.

The BGA-issued Gliding Certificate (aka Glider Pilot Certificate) is being phased out, in favour of a new Sailplane Pilot Licence (SPL). These will still be issued by the BGA, under Delegated Authority from the CAA. The SPL is specified in UK Part-SFCL. The SPL is an ICAO-compliant licence which can be used abroad. Existing Gliding Certificates can be converted to an SPL. The BGA also issues the Glider Pilot Licence, which is not compliant with Part-SFCL and is being phased out.

An elected Executive Committee of twelve is responsible for running the BGA. There are nine sub-committees covering the BGA's functions:

- Airspace,
- Competitions and Awards, (including the British Team)
- Communications and Marketing,
- Development (of the sport and clubs),
- Instructors,
- Safety,
- Strategic Planning,
- Finance, Staff and Administration,
- Technical (airworthiness and other engineering issues).

Although the BGA has full-time staff much routine work for the committees is, or have been, almost full-time activities for some BGA volunteers. Examples of major additional activities have been the monitoring proposed European legislation and the evaluation proposals by the CAA to fit transponders on all gliders. The BGA also publishes a bi-monthly magazine, Sailplane & Gliding.

The seven Scottish gliding clubs whilst remaining under the aegis of the BGA have also formed the Scottish Gliding Association to liaise with the local and national authorities in Scotland.

=== Junior gliding ===
The BGA coordinates junior gliding in the UK, including the designation of Junior Gliding Centres and national competitions in the UK, for pilots up to 25 years of age.

== Staff ==
The BGA employs a Chief Executive (Pete Stratten) who is based at the Leicester headquarters with five administrative staff. The Association also employs two National Coaches, a Development Officer, a Chief Technical Officer, the editor of the magazine, and a part-time officer who awards the gliding badges of the Fédération Aéronautique Internationale and some badges specific to the UK, such as the UK 750 km Diploma. Approximately 1,000 badge claims are processed every year.

== Notable UK gliding clubs ==
- Buckminster Gliding Club
- Booker Gliding Club
- Cambridge Gliding Centre
- Cotswold Gliding Club
- Darlton Gliding Club
- Denbigh Gliding Club
- Imperial College Gliding Club
- Kent Gliding Club
- Lasham Gliding Society
- London Gliding Club
- Midland Gliding Club
- Nottingham University Gliding Club
- Oxford Gliding Club
- Scottish Gliding Union
- Shenington Gliding Club at Shenington Airfield
- Windrushers Gliding Club
- Yorkshire Gliding Club
