= JPA International =

- Company type: S.A. (corporation)
- Founded: 1947 (foundation of the first firm); 1987 (establishment of the network)
- Founder: Jacques Potdevin
- Headquarters: Paris, France
- Number of locations: 190 (2022)
- Key people: Jacques Potdevin (chairman); Hervé Puteaux (CEO)
- Revenue: €214 million (2022)
- Number of employees: 4,500 (2021)
- Website: https://www.jpainternational.com/

JPA International is an international professional services network specializing in accounting, auditing, and consulting. In 2022, according to Accountancy Age, JPA was ranked among the top 25 international audit and accounting networks.

== History ==
Jacques Potdevin has been leading JPA since 1975, succeeding his father Roger, who was also a chartered accountant and statutory auditor and founded the firm in 1947 in Paris. In 1987, Jacques Potdevin established the international network of the same name.

The network experienced significant growth in the early 1990s in Europe. In 1992, following the adoption of the Maastricht Treaty and the creation of the single market, the JPA network was established in 11 European countries, generating 200 million francs in revenue and employing 600 people. The network's objective at that time was to position itself as the preferred partner for SMEs.

JPA International continued its international expansion in the 2000s, including in Lebanon in 2002. By the end of 2004, the network had 90 offices in 40 countries.

In 2018, the network's leaders stated that their presence was nearing 60 countries. By the late 2010s, the network expanded into Latin America, notably in Mexico in 2019 and Chile in 2020.

In 2021, JPA International reported representing nearly 4,500 team members worldwide. By 2022, JPA was present in 82 countries through 190 firms.

== Activities ==
JPA International brings together member firms working in the fields of auditing, consulting, and accounting, relying on the resources and international network connections. Each year, JPA International organizes congresses for professionals within the network to exchange on regulatory and technical developments impacting their sector on a global scale.
