= Aeropro Eurofox =

Slovakian light aircraft

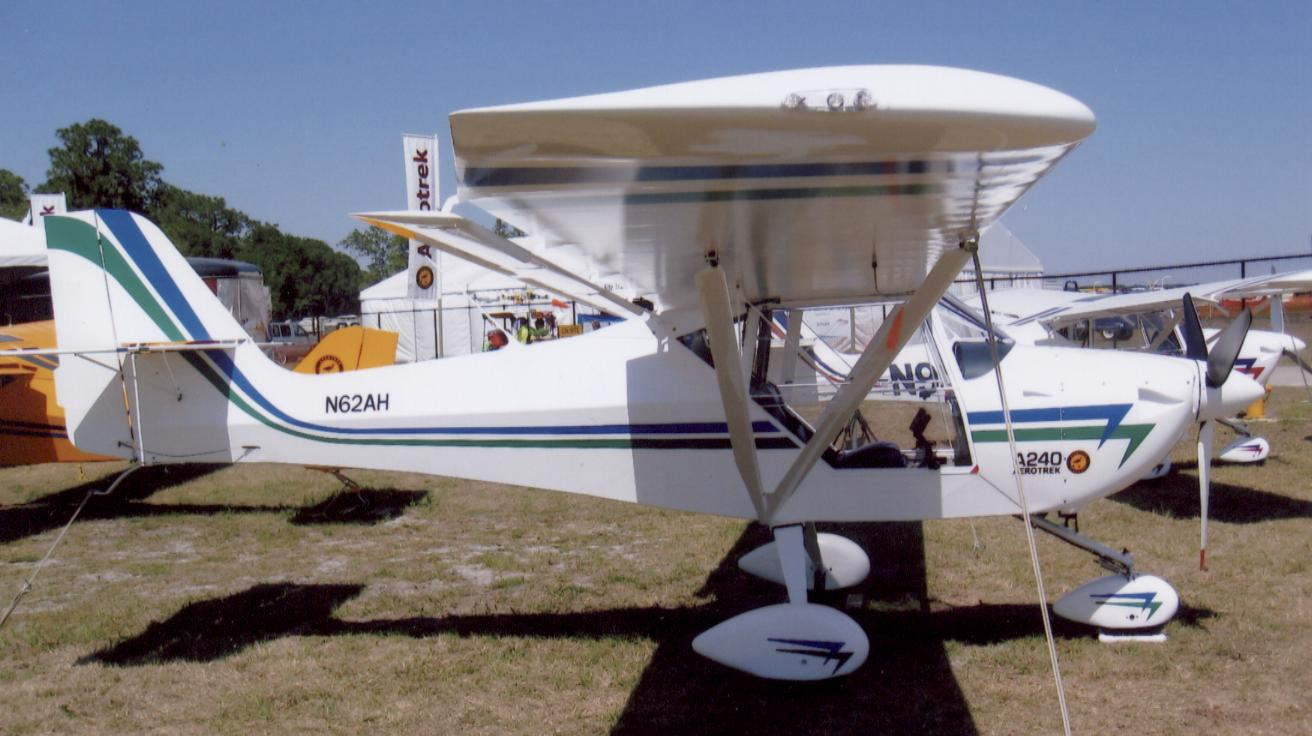
- Tri-gear Aeropro Eurofox at Lakeland, Florida (2009)

General information
- Type: Light aircraft, light-sport aircraft
- National origin: Slovakia
- Manufacturer: Aeropro s.r.o.
- Status: in production
- Primary user: private pilot owners
- Number built: over 700 by 2025

History
- Introduction date: 1991
- First flight: 1991

The Aeropro Eurofox is a Slovak-built two-seat light high-winged aircraft. It qualifies as a light-sport aircraft in the United States.

== Design and development ==
Aeropro was formed in 1990, and established its factory at Nitra in Slovakia. Deliveries of the Eurofox commenced in 1990. Since 1999, two versions have been produced, the conventional gear (taildragger) and the Tricycle gear. All versions have an enclosed cabin with two-side-by-side seats and folding wings. The Eurofox is sold in Europe as both factory complete and kit form, but is only available as a factory built aircraft in the U.S. In 2018 a group of secondary school pupils in Kinross, Fife completed building a kit as part of a science project.

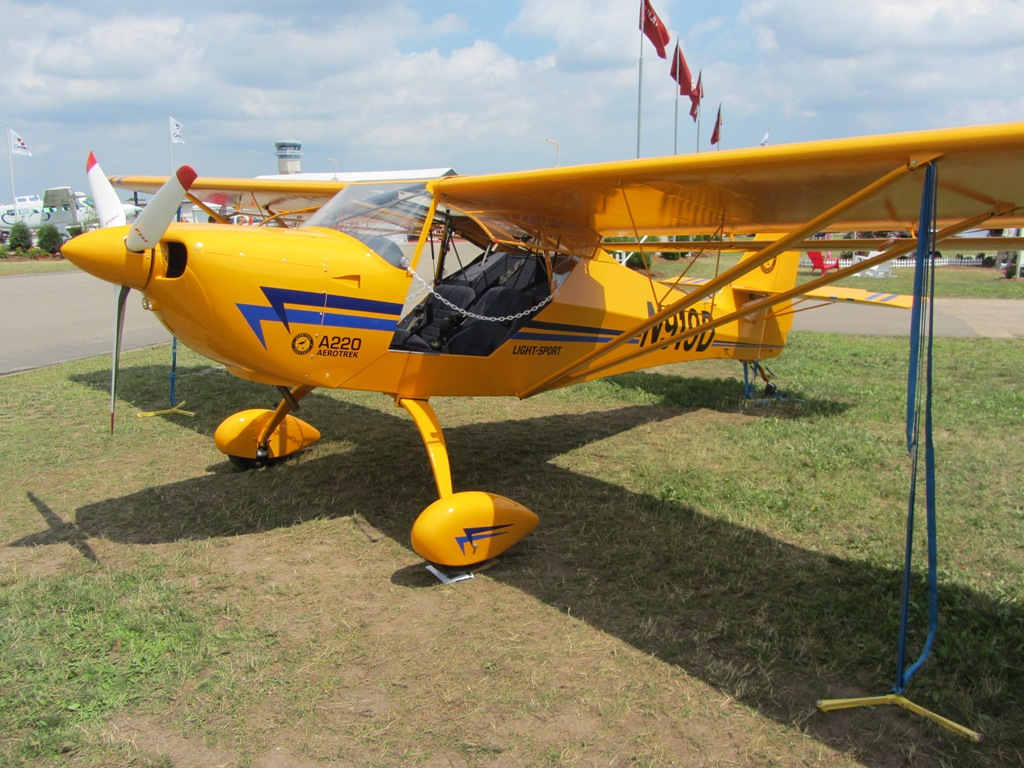
Aerotrek A220

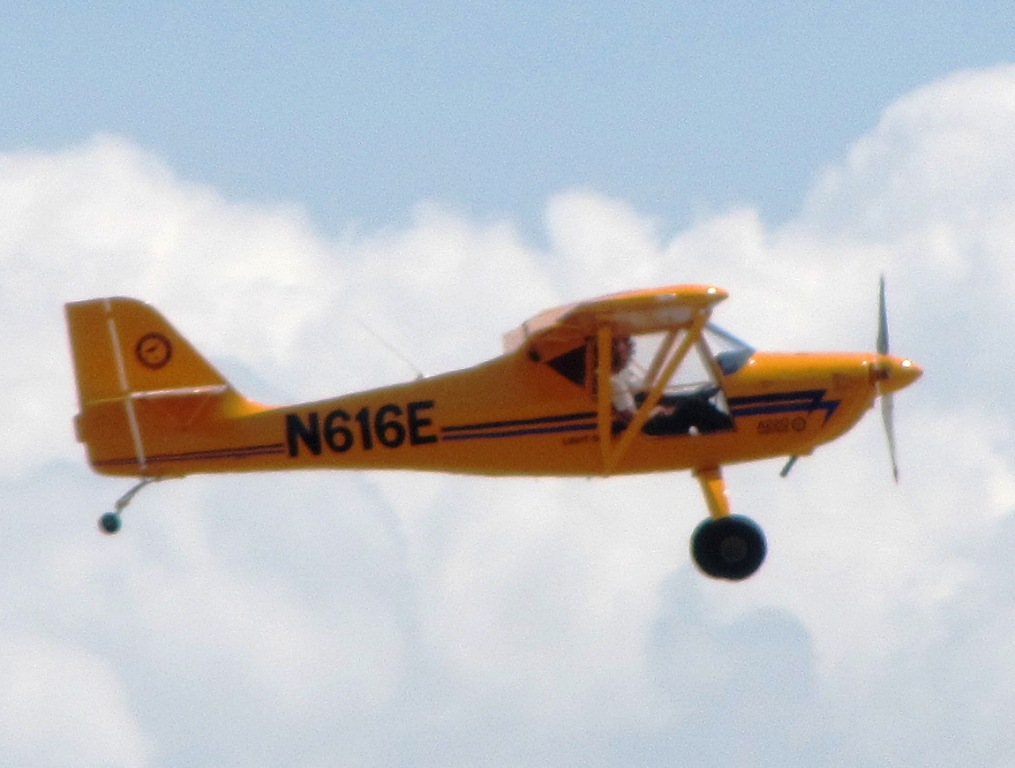
A220

From 2009, the Eurofox models were marketed in the US and Canada by Aerotrek Aircraft of Bloomfield, Indiana. This firm has named the tri-gear version as the Aerotrek A240 and the tailwheel version as the Aerotrek A220. Latest versions can be equipped with an optional parachute recovery system. Both versions are offered with the 80 hp (60 kW) Rotax 912UL and the 100 hp (75 kW) Rotax 912ULS engines.

== Operational history ==
The Eurofox has been sold in several countries, with over 170 having been delivered by mid-2004. Production continues and over 700 aircraft were flying with private owners by 2025.

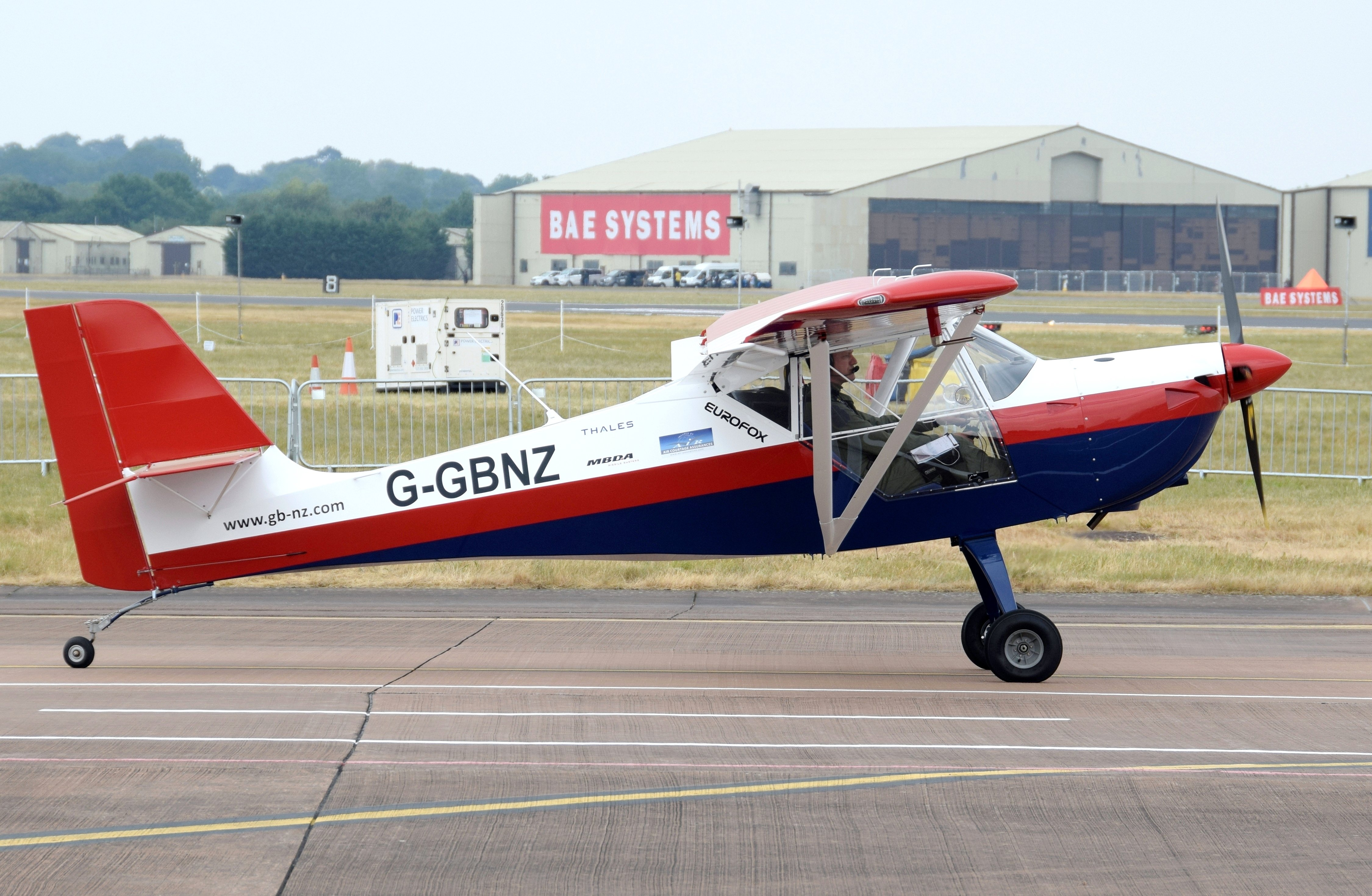
Aeropro Eurofox 912(iS) taxis for departure at the 2018 RIAT, England

== Variants ==
Eurofox-3K
Tri gear version. Sold in North America as the Aerotrek A240. It is an accepted US light-sport aircraft (LSA).
Eurofox-2K
Tailwheel version. Sold in North America as the Aerotrek A220 It is an accepted US LSA.
Eurofox Glider Tug
The tailwheel glider tug version is increasingly popular as a lightweight replacement for older types.
Eurofox Floats

== Specifications (Aerotrek A240) ==
Data from Aerotrek

General characteristics

- Crew: 1
- Capacity: 1 passenger
- Length: 5.64 m (18 ft 6 in)
- Wingspan: 9.12 m (29 ft 11 in)
- Height: 2.24 m (7 ft 4 in)
- Wing area: 10.45 m^{2} (112.5 sq ft)
- Empty weight: 293 kg (644 lb)
- Gross weight: 561 kg (1,235 lb)
- Powerplant: 1 × Rotax 912S , 75 kW (100 hp)

Performance

- Maximum speed: 230 km/h (143 mph, 124 kn)
- Cruise speed: 193 km/h (120 mph, 100 kn)
- Stall speed: 64 km/h (40 mph, 35 kn)
- Range: 966 km (600 mi, 520 nmi)
- Rate of climb: 5.1 m/s (1,000 ft/min)
- Wing loading: 54 kg/m^{2} (11 lb/sq ft)
