= Canada–Alaska Railway =

Proposed railway in North America

There have been various proposals to establish a rail line that links Canada and Alaska.

== History ==
=== 1890–1919 ===
The Edmonton and District Railway Company received a charter in 1898 to build westward from Edmonton, District of Alberta, North-West Territories, to Pelly River, Yukon. Changing the company name to the Edmonton, Yukon and Pacific Railway Company (EY&PR) in 1899, their charter eventually lapsed. That year, the White Pass and Yukon line opened between Skagway, Alaska, and Bennett, British Columbia (near the border). A year later, the line was extended to Whitehorse, Yukon. The British Columbia & Alaska Railway Company received a charter in 1910, but even its shrunken plans never eventuated.

Sir Richard McBride, the BC Premier (1903–15), encouraged nonviable railway development within the province, both emptying the provincial treasury, and ultimately undermining all railway projects and burdening stakeholders. In liaison with the Alaska authorities and the respective federal governments, he envisaged the Pacific Great Eastern Railway (PGE) (whose reaching Prince George was far from imminent), being further extended to the Alaskan border at a cost of $40–60 million. He however recognized the proposal's potential military value for the United States. President Wilson's signing of the Alaska Railroad Bill of 1914 expanded the Alaska rail network within that territory, which in turn increased optimism regarding the possibility of a line from Alaska through Dawson City to the Peace River Country.

=== 1920–1939 ===
A 1922 proposal by American capitalists to acquire the PGE as part of a Seattle–Alaska line lacked credibility. Between 1925 and 1946, the BC government had a standing offer of 16 million acres (65,000 km^{2}) of land to anyone willing to buy its PGE railway.

The Edmonton, Dunvegan and British Columbia Railway reached westward from Alberta to Dawson Creek, BC, in 1930. Earlier, rumours had circulated regarding an extension from this railhead through the Yukon to the Alaskan territory.

Interest waning, the 1930s were more focused upon a highway to Alaska.

=== 1940–1949 ===
During World War II, the head of the United States Western Defence Command and Fourth Army announced there was no pressing need for a railway to Alaska.

The United States Army Corps of Engineers surveyed a rail route during 1942–1943. When Japan ceased to be a threat, the idea was temporarily abandoned, until tensions arose with the Soviet Union. If the sea-routes to Alaska were threatened, it was considered the Alaska Highway had the capacity to supply only one division of troops stationed in the north. In 1948, a resolution was passed by the U.S. House of Representatives Foreign Relations committee to approve negotiations between Canada and the United States for the construction of a rail line.

The Port of Seattle and its feeder railroads were opposed to the project because it would reduce its sea-freight traffic with Alaska. Nevertheless, Senator Warren Magnuson, from Washington state, was a strong proponent of the scheme. He envisaged a link connecting the Fairbanks-Seward line with the Alaska-Yukon boundary. The PGE would build and operate the line northwest to this point, the project being financed by the American Congress in the form of prepaid trackage rights.

The US Senate approved negotiations with Canada, but the House of Representatives resolution failed. The Senate Foreign Relations committee requested the president's co-operation with the Canadian government on surveys and studies. In due course, President Truman signed the railroad bill, which authorised him to negotiate an agreement with Canada for the $112-million Prince George-Fairbanks link. Opinion remained divided over the military merits of the scheme.

=== 1950–1969 ===
Consultants and contractors seeking a business interest in the venture realized that unless the project was well advanced by the end of the Korean War (1950–53), the proposal would likely evaporate. Consequently, they emphasized its urgency, in light of the immediate Soviet threat.

The provincial government and the respective central BC communities were very supportive and looked forward to Prince George, with its promised new rail connections, becoming the nodal point.

The PGE provided Prince George with a direct southerly connection in 1952, and extended north to Fort St. John and Dawson Creek by 1958. The two transcontinental railways in Canada had refused to build the latter link without a legal guarantee of sufficient freight revenue to make the line profitable. This was equally true for the Alaska proposal.

Entrepreneur, Axel Wenner-Gren, promised partial financial backing for the venture, titled the Pacific Northern Railway (PNR). A report prepared by the Battelle Memorial Institute estimated that the line would require an annual subsidy of $34 million by 1980. Construction costs would be $114 million. The Alaska International Rail and Highway Commission pressed for the U.S. Congress to endorse the concept, while relying upon Axel Wenner-Gren for the financing, but no significant progress occurred prior to his death.

=== 1970–1999 ===
In 1972, the PGE was renamed the British Columbia Railway (BCR). The following year, the first 125 miles (200 km) of the Dease Lake branch line opened at a capital cost of $75 million, followed by an operating loss of $25 million on the route over a six-year period. Since even optimistic traffic increases would not attain break-even point, the line was abandoned for seven years. An agreement with logging company users recouped the further $25 million spent to replace rotted ties and washed out ballast needed for the rehabilitation. Mixed trains ran twice weekly.

Calls were made to extend the branch more than 1,000 miles (1,600 km) north through the Yukon and into Alaska to join the federally-owned Alaska state railroad. An Alaska state study outlined numerous economic benefits from developing mineral resources and suggested it could become a trunk line to Alaska ports. Although preliminary studies showed the project financially feasible and environmentally sound, the BC government displayed no appetite for further financial commitments. It regarded financing as primarily the responsibility of the U.S. federal and Alaskan governments, with some contribution by the Canadian government. The prohibitive $2-billion cost put an indefinite damper on building the link.

=== 2000–present ===
A 2006 study indicated a capital cost at $10.5 billion and suggested it be a joint public-private project. A 2015 study by the Van Horne Institute, which was commissioned by AECOM, examined a line between Fort McMurray, Alberta, and the Port of Valdez, Alaska, for carrying bitumen, petroleum and other products. Covering 1,525 miles (2,454 km), the estimated capital cost was $28–34 billion depending upon the volume of product shipped.

In June 2019, the Alaska Railroad Corp. board of directors gave agreement to link Alaska and Canada by rail. Construction was estimated to cost US$13 billion and was still pending permitting, land acquisition, and other planning. Per the agreement, the Alaska-Alberta Railway Development Corp. (a.k.a. "A2A Rail") received an “exclusive right” to operate an Alaska-Canada railroad between Alaska and Fort McMurray, Alberta. Business reasons for developing this railroad were cited as access to Alberta oil sands as well as providing an alternative to overloaded mainland U.S. ports for inbound intermodal shipping from Asia. The concept never got beyond the planning stage and in 2021, the company was put in receivership. The project was on hold due to financial irregularities between A2A's only shareholder, Sean McCoshen, and A2A's main financial backer Bridging Finance Inc.
