= Marwick =

Marwick can be both a masculine given name and a surname. Notable people with the name include:

- Marwick Khumalo, Swazi parliamentarian
- Arthur Marwick (1936–2006), British social historian
- Ernest Marwick (1915–1977), Scottish writer
- Hugh Marwick (1885–1965), Scottish scholar
- James Marwick (1862–1936), founder of accountancy practice KPMG
- John Marwick (1891–1978), New Zealand palaeontologist and geologist
- Thomas Marwick (1895–1960), Australian politician
- Thomas P. Marwick (1854–1927), Scottish architect
- Tricia Marwick (born 1953), Scottish politician
- Warren Marwick (1869–1955), Australian politician
- William Marwick (1833–1925), Western Australian settler
