= China Medical =

China Medical may refer to:

- China Medical Board, a nonprofit organization that promotes health education and research in medical universities of China and Southeast Asia.
- China Medical Technologies, a Cayman Islands corporation based in China, currently in liquidation following fraud allegations.
- China Medical University (PRC), a university in the People's Republic of China.
- China Medical University (Taiwan), a private university in Taiwan.
