= Bondfield Construction =

Defunct Ontario construction company

Bondfield Construction Co. Ltd. was a Canadian construction company that specialized in public-sector projects in Ontario. The company entered creditor protection in 2019 amid severe financial distress and a procurement scandal at its largest project. In 2025, its former president, John Aquino, and a senior hospital executive, Vas (Vasos) Georgiou, were convicted of fraud related to the procurement of the St. Michael's Hospital redevelopment in Toronto.

== History ==
Bondfield was founded in the 1970s by Ralph Aquino in the Toronto area, focusing on schools and public-infrastructure projects. Ralph's sons, John and Steve Aquino, later became senior executives; John Aquino served as president and CEO until October 2018, when he was replaced by Steve Aquino as the firm's finances deteriorated.

On April 4, 2019, Bondfield and affiliates obtained protection under the Companies’ Creditors Arrangement Act, with EY appointed as court-supervised monitor. By this time, Bondfield was significantly behind on its two largest projects and was being sued by subcontractors for unpaid invoices. The company was granted creditor protection in April 2019 after failing to renegotiate a lending facility with high-yield lender Bridging Finance Inc..

== Criminal charges and conflict of interest ==
In March 2023, Ontario's Serious Fraud Office and Ontario Provincial Police charged John Aquino and Vas Georgiou with fraud over $5,000 and related offences concerning the hospital's C$300 million redevelopment project.

In October 2025, Justice Peter Bawden of the Superior Court of Justice (Ontario) found both men guilty of two counts each of fraud over $5,000. Bawden's 135-page decision concluded that Georgiou secretly provided Aquino with “confidential, highly material and obviously intended to assist Bondfield” during the bid evaluation process, using a Bondfield-supplied email address and a BlackBerry phone. The ruling noted that although Bondfield's C$299 million bid was the lowest among three finalists and its technical design scored lower than a competing C$538 million proposal from PCL Construction, Georgiou was “the most persistent and passionate voice” in favour of Bondfield's bid, arguing that St. Michael's “did not expect a Rolls-Royce design; they were just hoping for a Toyota.”

Allegations about Georgiou's undisclosed ties to Aquino were first reported in 2015–2016 by The Globe and Mail. St. Michael's suspended and then dismissed Georgiou in November 2015 after those reports.

An Infrastructure Ontario special-committee report released in June 2016 stated that the St. Michael's procurement “was not compromised” and that Infrastructure Ontario's Alternative Finance and Procurement (AFP) process met integrity standards, while acknowledging Georgiou's conflict-of-interest failure. Subsequent reporting questioned that conclusion after Bawden's 2025 verdict found the procurement had indeed been tainted. The same article cited internal e-mails and FOI documents revealing concerns about IO's handling of multiple Bondfield projects, including water leaks, structural cracking, and cost overruns at facilities built for ErinoakKids.

For Infrastructure Ontario's internal investigation of the St. Michael's procurement, related quality-control issues, and subsequent reforms, see Infrastructure Ontario procurement and oversight.

== St. Michael's Hospital redevelopment ==
Bondfield's “SMH 3.0” redevelopment contract was awarded in March 2015 for approximately C$299 million. Construction began the same year. In December 2018, the project's special-purpose subsidiary (“Project Co”) was placed in receivership, and on April 4, 2019, Bondfield obtained CCAA protection.

Following the receivership, surety provider Zurich Insurance Co. Ltd. assumed liability under performance bonds and retained EllisDon to complete the work.

Zurich subsequently commenced a civil action against Bondfield, Aquino, Georgiou, and Unity Health Toronto, alleging misrepresentation in connection with the surety bonds. In a 2020 monitor filing, Ernst & Young reported that it had collected data from multiple Bondfield servers, identified roughly 107,000 potentially relevant documents, and discovered a targeted “Deletion Event” in September 2015 involving about 4,600 e-mails containing terms such as “vas.georgiou” and “bccldevelopment.” The monitor noted no evidence of deletions beyond that event.

Unity Health Toronto stated that the criminal wrongdoing was confined to Georgiou and that the hospital has since audited its procurement controls. As of late 2025, the hospital redevelopment's expected completion was 2026, at an estimated total cost of C$577 million — almost doubling the original C$300 million budget.

== Creditor protection and recovery ==
The monitor alleged that more than C$80 million in false invoices were issued to Bondfield and its affiliate Forma-Con by entities controlled by Aquino, and that C$33 million of those payments were subject to statutory recovery. The Supreme Court of Canada affirmed those findings in Aquino v. Bondfield Construction Co. (2024 SCC 31), holding that a corporation can be deemed to act with its directing mind's fraudulent intent for purposes of Bankruptcy and Insolvency Act s. 96. Aquino was adjudged personally bankrupt in June 2025, with reported debts exceeding C$37 million.

== Infrastructure Ontario procurement and oversight ==
Bondfield was one of the most active mid-sized contractors participating in Infrastructure Ontario's Alternative Finance and Procurement (AFP) model during the 2010s. Between 2013 and 2015, Infrastructure Ontario awarded the company at least five major projects worth a combined C$840 million, including redevelopments at St. Michael's Hospital, Joseph Brant Hospital, Milton District Hospital, the ErinoakKids children's treatment centres, and Cambridge Memorial Hospital. Critics later described Infrastructure Ontario's decision to entrust so many concurrent projects to a single contractor as a major governance failure.

=== Procurement controversy ===
The 2015 St. Michael's Hospital procurement became Infrastructure Ontario's most controversial AFP project after The Globe and Mail revealed that the hospital's chief administrative officer, Vasos Georgiou, had undisclosed business ties with Bondfield president John Aquino. Infrastructure Ontario initially informed the Ontario Provincial Police but then opted to conduct its own inquiry rather than a criminal referral. The agency's then-general counsel, Marni Dicker, established a special board committee that commissioned an internal investigation by external counsel.

=== 2016 special-committee report ===
Infrastructure Ontario's special-committee report, released publicly in June 2016, concluded that while Georgiou had failed to disclose a conflict of interest, “the procurement process was not compromised.” The report found no evidence of improper influence and asserted that IO's evaluation procedures — particularly its reliance on lowest-price scoring — made undue influence “highly unlikely.” Several individuals involved in the procurement later told journalists they were not interviewed for the inquiry, and its findings were questioned after the 2025 criminal conviction of Georgiou and Aquino, which determined that the bid process had in fact been tainted by fraud.

=== Project oversight and quality issues ===
Freedom-of-information disclosures obtained by The Globe and Mail showed that Infrastructure Ontario officials and Ontario ministries were aware of major quality and performance concerns across multiple Bondfield projects, including water infiltration, structural cracking, and mechanical failures at the three ErinoakKids facilities completed in 2018. E-mails from ministry staff described Infrastructure Ontario's handling of the ErinoakKids project as “weak” and noted that “relationship lines have been crossed in inappropriate ways.” Similar oversight disputes were reported on Bondfield's hospital projects in Cambridge, Burlington, and Milton, where delays and change-order disputes strained lender and hospital relations.

=== Institutional response ===
Following Bondfield's collapse and the ensuing criminal proceedings, Infrastructure Ontario stated that it had strengthened its procurement integrity framework and introduced additional conflict-of-interest screening for senior executives and external bidders. In 2025, agency spokesperson Ian McConachie told The Globe and Mail that Infrastructure Ontario had “taken immediate action to ensure our high standards of integrity were being upheld” and continued to cooperate with law-enforcement agencies.

== Projects impacted by insolvency ==
Bondfield's insolvency affected multiple public-sector construction projects across Ontario, including hospital redevelopments and transit projects procured under Infrastructure Ontario's AFP model.

- Cambridge Memorial Hospital — Bondfield's delay-plagued hospital expansion was in default at the time of the 2019 bankruptcy filing. Lenders and the hospital called the Zurich performance bond after the project fell more than two years behind schedule. Under a 2020 settlement agreement, Zurich retained EllisDon to complete the remaining Phase 3 work at a cost of approximately C$187 million.
- Union Station — Bondfield was the general contractor for Phase 2 of Toronto's major station revitalization, responsible for concourse and retail reconstruction. The project experienced significant delays and cost overruns, and by 2019 was more than five years behind schedule. After Bondfield's insolvency, the City of Toronto worked with Zurich, its surety provider, to manage completion of Stages 2 and 3 under the existing contract. A 2022 City Council report recorded a confidential settlement among the city, Bondfield, and Zurich following substantial completion of the project. Earlier coverage described continuing disputes and payment issues before the bankruptcy, while a forensic investigation later cited the project in its review of Bondfield's invoicing practices. In 2018, the city was fined under the Ontario Fire Code after Bondfield construction fencing was found to have blocked emergency exits, contributing to an overcrowding violation.
- St. Michael's Hospital — Procurement later found to have been influenced by undisclosed conflicts; project completion reassigned to Zurich and EllisDon; substantial completion expected in 2026.

== Earlier completed projects ==
- ErinoakKids Centre for Treatment and Development — Bondfield led construction of three new children's treatment centres in Brampton, Oakville, and Mississauga under a C$163.3-million Infrastructure Ontario design-build-finance contract signed in 2014. Following completion, staff and ministry officials reported persistent water leaks, cracked structural elements, and elevator malfunctions. Freedom-of-information records later cited by The Globe and Mail showed that the Ministry of Children and Youth Services raised concerns about IO's handling of the project, with internal e-mails describing it as “a failure of process on so many levels.” Subsequent remediation was overseen by IO and replacement contractors after Bondfield's 2019 insolvency.
- Joseph Brant Hospital (Burlington) — The redevelopment project experienced delays and cost disputes prior to completion in 2018, shortly before Bondfield's creditor protection filing.
- Milton District Hospital (Halton Healthcare) — Bondfield participated in early-stage construction; subsequent maintenance issues and contractor disputes were reported by IO before the firm's collapse.
- Toronto South Detention Centre — Completed in 2014, the facility was later reported to have persistent building deficiencies and system failures; Bondfield's work on the project was referenced in later assessments of IO's contractor oversight.

Major Bondfield projects
Project	Sector / Location	Status following insolvency
St. Michael's Hospital	Health care (Toronto)	Project Co placed in receivership in 2018; completion reassigned to Zurich and EllisDon; expected completion 2026.
Cambridge Memorial Hospital	Health care (Cambridge)	Zurich called on performance bond; completion of Phase 3 by EllisDon under 2020 settlement agreement (C$187 million).
Union Station	Transit (Toronto)	City of Toronto and Zurich managed completion; confidential settlement among City, Bondfield, and Zurich recorded in 2022.
ErinoakKids Centre for Treatment and Development	Children's rehabilitation (Peel Region)	Completed 2018; significant post-construction deficiencies; oversight concerns raised by ministries and IO.
Joseph Brant Hospital	Health care (Burlington)	Completed 2018; experienced delays and disputes prior to Bondfield's CCAA filing.
Milton District Hospital	Health care (Milton)	Completed prior to insolvency; maintenance and contractor issues reported by IO.
Toronto South Detention Centre	Correctional (Toronto)	Completed 2014; subsequent operational and building deficiencies noted.
