= James David Marwick =

Scottish lawyer, historian and town clerk

Sir James David Marwick FRSE (15 July 1826 – 24 March 1908) was a Scottish lawyer, historian and town clerk. He served as Town Clerk of Glasgow for thirty-one years, during which time the entire city was transformed. Its powers and amenities were improved by by-laws and Acts of Parliament, and Marwick directed the city of Glasgow's development for much of the second half of the 19th century.

== Biography ==
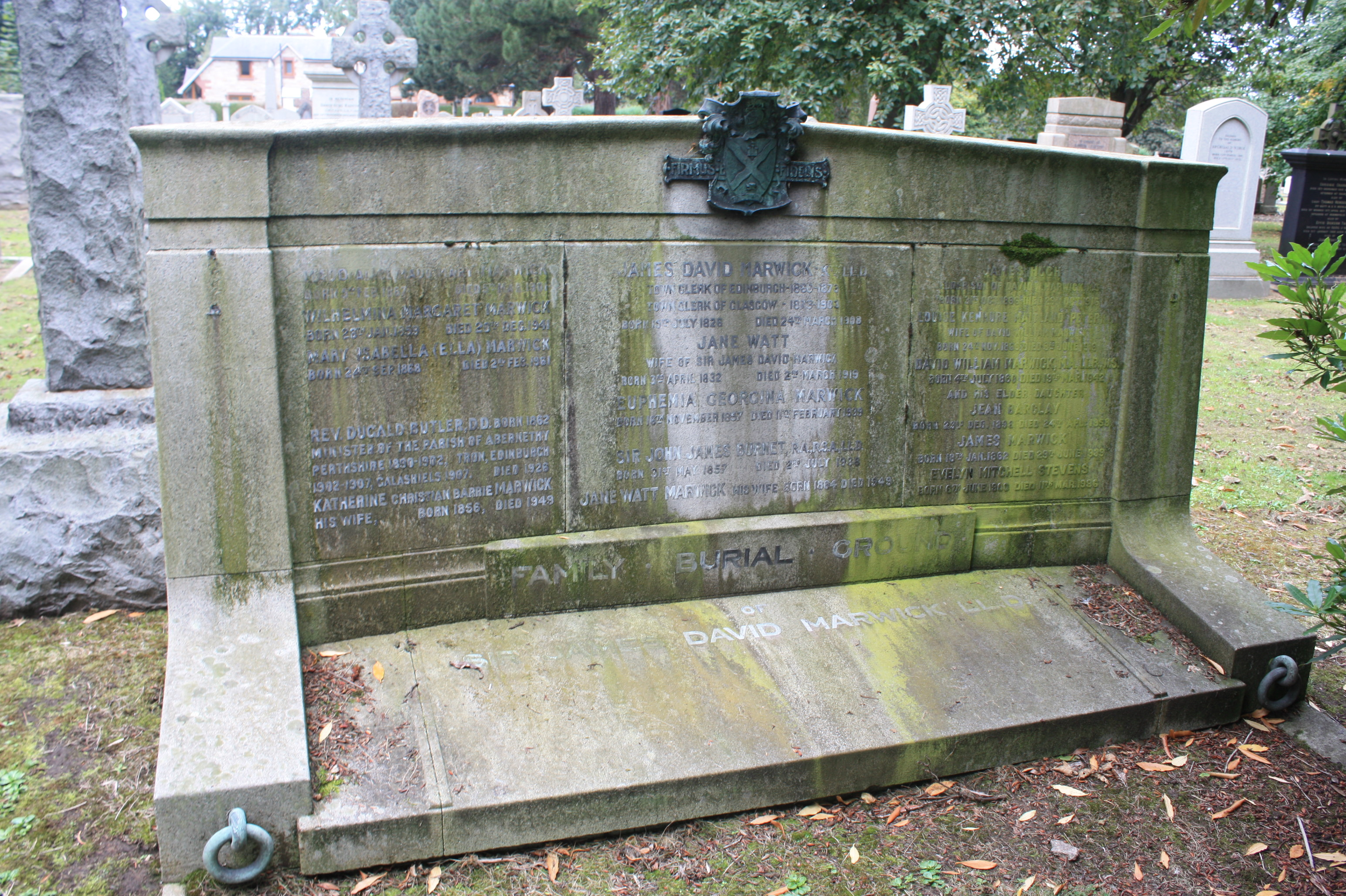
The grave of James David Marwick, Warriston Cemetery

A son of William Marwick, a merchant from Kirkwall, Orkney, and his wife, Margaret Garioch, James was born at 95 Kirkgate in central Leith, where his father then worked as a baker.

James was educated in Kirkwall Grammar School and then studied law at the University of Edinburgh. He was then apprenticed to James B Watt solicitor at 9 York Place in Edinburgh. He was admitted a procurator at Dundee in 1852, and became a solicitor before the Supreme Courts six years later. In 1855 he founded the Edinburgh legal firm of Watt & Marwick. As the address of this firm is also 9 York Place it is presumed he merged with the same James Watt under whom he was apprenticed.

For some time he was a member of the Town Council of Edinburgh, and he became Town Clerk of that city in 1860. He was also clerk to the Convention of Royal Burghs from 1861 to 1876. In 1873 Marwick was offered a salary of £2,500 per annum (three times his previous salary) to succeed Angus Turner as Glasgow's Town Clerk. He used his influence to promote the expansion of the city's boundaries. The City Chambers was erected between 1882 and 1888 as a symbol of municipal confidence and wealth. During those years he occupied a unique place in the municipal, literary, and social life of the city. He enjoyed the friendship of the successive Lord Provosts of Edinburgh and Glasgow. He gradually built up a reputation as the leading authority on municipal law in Scotland. His knowledge was utilised by successive Lord Advocates, and his opinion constantly sought by the Town Clerks of other burghs; and in no instance was that opinion overturned by the Courts. As a municipal organiser he had the task of framing and carrying out many of the greatest city enterprises of his time, including extension and improvements of the city, duplication of the water-works, the purification of the River Clyde, the Municipal Tramways, and municipal electricity.

Marwick was also a prolific historian and writer. It was upon his initiative that the Scottish Burgh Record Society was founded, and he edited a number of the society's publications. He never lost interest in the island county from which he sprang, and many a young Orcadian, on coming south, was indebted to him for advice and help. Fellow Orcadian and town councillor William Walls was a particular friend. When in Edinburgh he took an active interest in the affairs of the Augustine Church, of which the Rev. William Lindsay Alexander was minister. In Glasgow he also took an active part in the management of Trinity Congregational Church.

In 1861 he served as the first President of the Edinburgh Photographic Society.

Marwick was elected a Fellow of the Royal Society of Edinburgh in 1864 his proposer being Charles Piazzi Smyth. He received the degree of LL.D. from Glasgow University in 1878. The Freedom of the Burgh of Kirkwall was conferred on him later, and in 1888, on the occasion of her visit to the first Glasgow Exhibition, Queen Victoria gave him the honour of knighthood, this being the first occasion in which a municipal officer in Scotland was thus distinguished. When he left Edinburgh in 1873 the Corporation and citizens presented his wife with a full-length portrait of him painted by George Herdman, R.S.A., and on his retiral from the Town Clerkship of Glasgow in 1904 he was presented with an address and a valuable gift in testimony of the esteem in which he was held by the officials of the Corporation. Subsequently the citizens had his bust executed in duplicate by George Frampton, one of these being lodged in the art galleries, and the other presented to Sir James's family.

He lived his final years at 19 Woodside Terrace in Glasgow.

He died on 24 March 1908 and is buried in Warriston Cemetery in Edinburgh. The unusual monument lies to the north of the vaults.

== Family ==
His wife, Lady Jane Marwick, whom he married in 1855, was a daughter of James Black Watt, a solicitor in Edinburgh, with whom he had a son James Marwick, an accountant who founded one of the predecessor firms of KPMG.

His daughter Jean Watt Warwick married the architect John James Burnet.

== Published works ==
As writer:

- History of the High Constables of Edinburgh (1865)
- Precedence of Edinburgh and Dublin (1865)
- Suggestions for the Conduct of School Board Elections in Burghs in Scotland (1873)
- Suggestions for the Conduct of School Board Elections in Parishes in Scotland (1876)
- Observations on the Law and Practice of Municipal Elections, and the Conduct of the Business of Town Councils and Commissioners of Police in Scotland (1879)
- Report on Markets and Fairs in Scotland (1890)
- The River Clyde and the Harbour of Glasgow (1898)
- The Water Supply of the City of Glasgow (1901)
- The Municipal Institutions of Scotland, an Historical Survey (1904)
- Edinburgh Guilds and Crafts (1909)

As editor:

- Records of the Convention of Royal Burghs of Scotland, 4 vols. (1866–85)
- Records of the City and Royal Burgh of Edinburgh, 4 vols. (1869–82)
- Charters and Documents relating to the Collegiate Church and Hospital of the Holy Trinity and the Trinity Hospital (1871)
- Charters of the City of Edinburgh (1871)
- Records of the Burgh of Peebles, with historical preface by Dr. William Chambers (1872)
- Records of the City and Royal Burgh of Glasgow, 2 vols. (1876–82)
- Charters of the City of Glasgow (1894)
- Historical Preface to the Glasgow Publications (1897)
- Miscellany of the Scottish Burgh Records Society (1881)
