= William Barclay Peat =

British businessman (1852–1936)

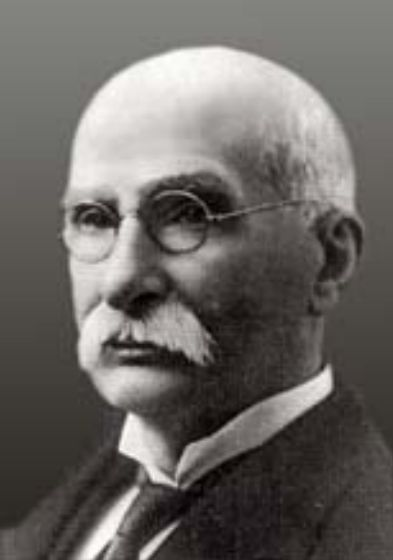
- Born: 1852
- Died: 1936 (aged 83–84)
- Occupations: Accountant, businessman

Sir William Barclay Peat CVO (15 February 1852 – 24 January 1936) was an accountant and one of the founders of KPMG.

== Career ==
Peat born in Forebank, St Cyrus, Kincardine, Scotland. He was the second son of James Peat and Margaret Barclay (of the banking family that built Barclays, one of England's largest banks). Peat studied at Montrose Academy in Scotland, and was then apprenticed to a local solicitor but he did not enter the legal profession. Instead, he moved to London in 1870 and was hired as a junior accounting clerk for a London firm, becoming a partner in 1876.

Peat became senior partner of the firm, which was renamed William Barclay Peat & Company, in 1891. He was knighted in 1912. The senior partner of the firm was selected from the Peat family for some 75 years.

He served as President of the Institute of Chartered Accountants in England and Wales (ICAEW) from 1906 to 1908.

Peat died in 1936.
