= William Walls =

Scottish lawyer, industrialist and Dean of Guild of Glasgow

William Walls, Bailie caricature, 1874.

William Walls (2 August 1819 – 27 September 1893) was a Scottish lawyer, industrialist and Dean of Guild of Glasgow.

The son of John Walls and Elizabeth (née Flett), he was born in Kirkwall, Orkney, and trained as a lawyer in Edinburgh before founding whale oil merchants and refiners William Walls & Co in 1847, in Glasgow. Walls served as a town councilor of Glasgow from 1868 to 1886, latterly acting as Treasurer. He is credited as helping to secure the post of Town Clerk for his fellow Orcadian Sir James David Marwick who was to largely influence and direct the lines of Glasgow's development in the second half of the 19th century. Walls was instrumental in developing Loch Katrine as a reservoir to provide clean water for Glasgow's burgeoning population and, among other awards, was presented with a medal by the corporation and citizens in recognition of his services in 1859. He was appointed Dean of Guild of Glasgow in 1887 and continued in this position until his retirement in 1889.

His company, William Walls & Co, played an instrumental role in the substantial growth of Glasgow as one of Britain's leading industrial cities and by the 1860s was a major local employer. The Maryhill works grew exponentially and this sometimes brought Walls into conflict with early anti-pollution legislation. In 1874 he was charged with contravening the smoke section of the Glasgow Police Act 1862 (25 & 26 Vict. c. cciv), but the case was later dismissed. A caricature in The Bailie portrays Walls comforting a policeman seemingly overcome by the effects of smoke-inhalation, an image which is also strongly redolent of his power and influence as a leading industrialist and burgh councilor.

Walls married Sarah Cole, daughter of Thomas Cole, in 1847, and was succeeded as senior partner of William Walls & Co in 1889 by his eldest son William Andrew Walls. Walls Street in Glasgow is named after him.

== Sources ==
- Memoir of Sir James David Marwick, John Gray McKendrick, 1909.
- The Lord Provosts of Glasgow from 1833 to 1902, John Tweed, 1902.
- Walls family papers (unpublished material)
- Glasgow City Archives, Dean of Guild Court
