= Piet Klijnveld =

Dutch accountant

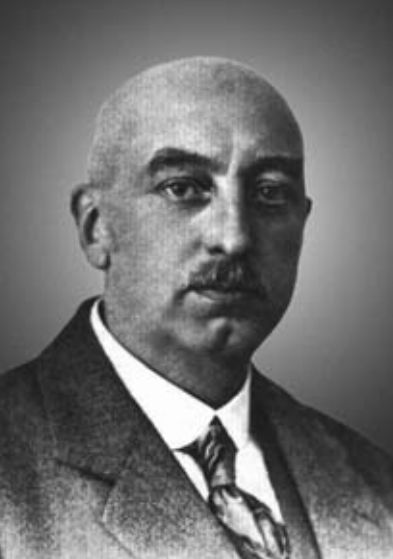
Piet Klijnveld (1874-1945)

Pieter 'Piet' Klijnveld (16 August 1874 – 9 February 1945) was a Dutch accountant who started a practice that, after several mergers, would grow into the international accounting firm KPMG.

== Life and career ==
Pieter Klijnveld was born on 16 August 1874 in Amsterdam in the Netherlands.

After working at the Amsterdam office of the Twentsche Bank (a precursor of ABN AMRO), he opened a small accountancy practice in 1917 in his home on the Viottastraat in Amsterdam. Amsterdam was a bustling trade and investment hub for European and Asian industrialists. Many foreign enterprises, including royalty, governments, and even the Bank of England, traded extensively in the Netherlands at the time, making it an active market for financiers as well as importers and exporters of virtually everything. Klijnveld became the chief accountant to many of these emerging businesses.

One of these accountants he worked with was Jaap Kraayenhof, who joined Klynveld and eventually become senior partner of the Dutch firm "Klijnveld Kraayenhof & Co.", abroad usually written as Klynveld Kraayenhof & Co. (KKC).

Klijnveld died just before the liberation of the Netherlands in 1945.
