= Alaska-Alberta Railway Development Corporation =

Bankrupt Canadian rail development company

Overview
- Other name: A2A Rail
- Status: Receivership
- Owner: McCoshen Group
- Termini: Delta Junction, Alaska, United States; Fort McMurray, Alberta, Canada
- Connecting lines: Alaska Railroad; Canadian National Railway
- Website: a2arail.com ^{(Archived 20 June 2021)}

Service
- Type: international freight

Technical
- Track length: 1,600 mi (2,600 km)
- Num of tracks: single with passing sidings
- Track gauge: 1,435 mm (4 ft 8 1/2 in) standard gauge

The Alaska-Alberta Railway Development Corporation (also known as A2A for Alaska to Alberta) was an entity created to build, own, and operate a proposed 2,600-kilometre (1,600 mi) railroad between Delta Junction, Alaska, United States, and Fort McMurray, Alberta, Canada. The concept never got beyond the planning stage and in 2021, the company was put in receivership. The project was on hold due to financial irregularities between A2A's only shareholder, Sean McCoshen, and A2A's main financial backer Bridging Finance Inc. At the time of the receivership filing, the railroad was still in a conceptual stage and the only assets identified by the receiver were consulting reports and intellectual property. Total debts owed to Bridging Finance were approximately $212.9 million. McCoshen filed for personal bankruptcy in Oregon two months after A2A entered receivership.

== Route ==
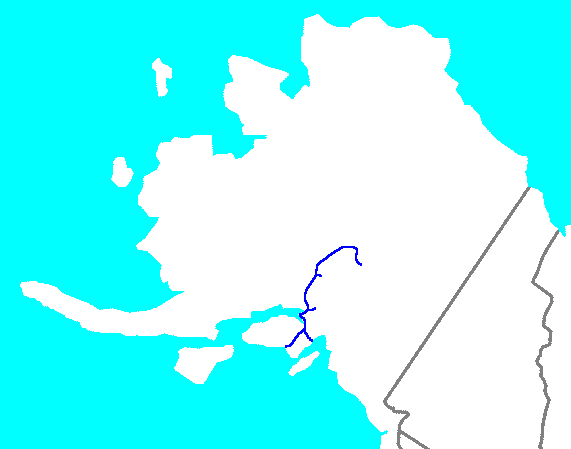

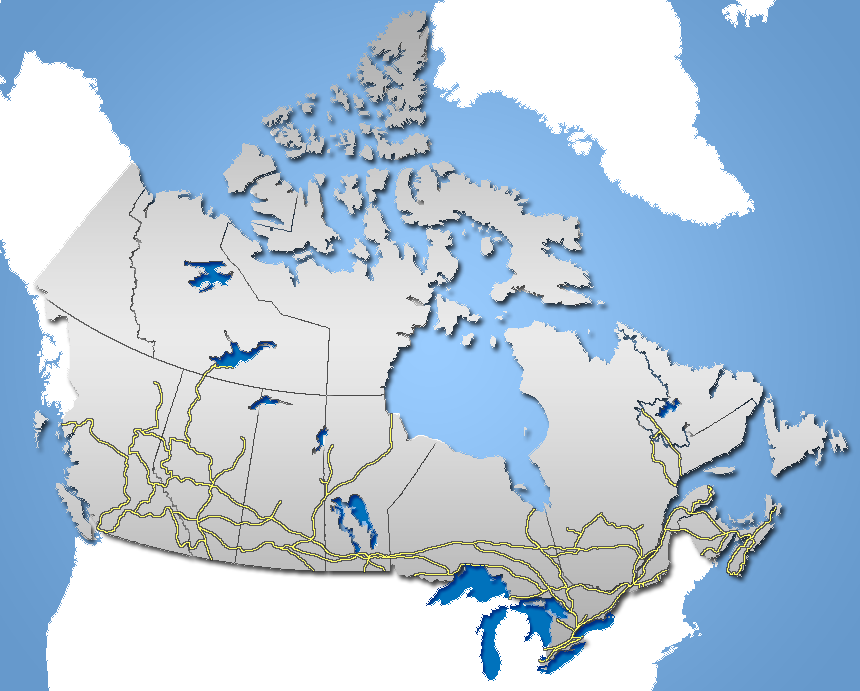
The A2A intended to connect the isolated Alaska Railroad (above) and the rest of the North America via connections in Alberta to the Canadian railway network (below)

The proposed A2A railway would have connected to the Alaska Railroad at Delta Junction, Alaska, and run through the Yukon to Fort Nelson, British Columbia, and from there to a terminus at Fort McMurray, Alberta. The A2A Railway had also been negotiating with the Mat-Su Borough on an agreement to complete the Port Mackenzie Railway Extension.

The railroad was planned to interchange with and operate on part of the Alaska Railroad, in order to access Southcentral Alaska and its ports. As of 2020 the project was estimated to cost CA$20 billion. A rival enterprise, G7G Railway, estimated in 2020 the capital cost to be just under US$20 billion. They proposed shipping oil, via the Trans-Alaska Pipeline, from rail cars in Delta Junction to the coast.

== Planning ==
The Van Horne Institute studied the route in 2013. A survey of the proposed route by the development corporation began in July 2020.

On September 25, 2020, US President Donald Trump announced he would issue a presidential permit to the railway, which had an agreement with Alaska Railway to develop a joint operating plan for the rail connection to Canada.

A2A announced that JP Gladu was joining as President of A2A Rail Canada. In July 2020, the company announced the start of land surveys in the Alberta segment. However, there is no evidence of substantive field work being undertaken.

== Creditor protection ==
In 2021, the Ontario Securities Commission (OSC) began investigating irregularities in the business dealings between the main financier of the A2A project, Bridging Finance Inc., and A2A's president, Sean McCoshen. The OSC alleged that following the funding of loans to various McCoshen companies, McCoshen funnelled a total of $19.5 million to Bridging's CEO David Sharpe. Additionally, the OSC also alleged that "millions of dollars pledged for A2A rail also went to McCoshen's personal bank account and to an apparently unrelated company controlled by him."

With the investigation underway, Bridging Finance was placed under receivership in April 2021. Bridging's receiver, PricewaterhouseCoopers requested repayment of A2A's $149 million loan in early June 2021. A2A did not have the funds available to repay the loan and it filed for creditor protection in June 2021. McCoshen no longer appeared on the A2A website as an officer of the company.

Work on the project was abandoned.

== See also ==
- Canada–Alaska Railway — early concepts for similar routes
- Rail transport in Canada
- Rail transportation in the United States
