= Klynveld Kraayenhof & Co. =

Dutch accounting firm

Klynveld Kraayenhof & Co. (KKC) was a Dutch accountancy firm founded in 1917 by Piet Klijnveld and Jaap Kraayenhof, who was one of Klynveld's former employees at another firm. The firm specialized in banking and exporting and kept its independence by serving Dutch clients who were expanding throughout Europe and South America. In 1979, KKC merged with Deutsche Treuhand-Gesellschaft (DTG) and McLintock Main Lafrentz to form Klynveld Main Goerdeler (KMG). In 1987 KMG joined forces with Peat Marwick International (PMI) in the first mega-merger of large accounting firms and formed what is now known today as KPMG LLP.
