= China Medical Technologies =

China Medical Technologies Inc.
- Company type: Public
- Traded as: Nasdaq: CMED
- Industry: Medical technology
- Predecessor: Beijing Yuande Bio-Medical Engineering Co., Ltd., or YDME Beijing
- Founded: July 2004; 21 years ago, in Cayman Islands
- Headquarters: No. 24 Yong Chang North Road, Beijing Economic and Technological Development Area, Beijing, China
- Key people: Wu Xiaodong (chairman & CEO); Tak Yung Samson Tsang (CFO)
- Products: Medical devices
- Revenue: CNY 842 million ▲ (FY 2011)
- Operating income: CNY 249 million (FY 2011)
- Net income: CNY 82 million (FY 2011)
- Total assets: CNY 4.948 billion (FY 2011)
- Number of employees: 971 (31 March 2011)
- Website: www.chinameditech.com (Archived)

China Medical Technologies, Inc. (CMED) was a Cayman Islands corporation based in China, currently in liquidation following fraud allegations. It purported to develop, manufacture, and market high intensity focused ultrasound therapy systems ("Model: FEP-BY02"), advanced in vitro diagnostic ("IVD") products using enhanced chemiluminescence ("ECLIA") technology, fluorescent in-situ hybridization ("FISH") technology, and surface plasmon resonance ("SPR") technology to detect and monitor various diseases and disorders.

CMED ceased operating in early 2012, leaving investors unpaid on $426 million worth of bond debt as a result of a suspected fraud by CMED's former Chairman & CEO. The company is in default due to failure to pay interest to its bondholders. CMED filed for bankruptcy in 2012, and its liquidator is probing an alleged $355 million insider fraud, and alleges that "CMED's creditors and equity holders may have been the victims of a massive multi-year fraud."

In February 2012, the company's shares in the United States moved from the NASDAQ to the pink sheets. In March 2012, the CMED American depositary shares (ADSs) were delisted from NASDAQ, and in June 2012 the CMED ordinary shares were deregistered. Since July 2012, pursuant to an Order by the Grand Court of the Cayman Islands, CMED has been under the control of Joint Official Liquidators. In August 2012, the company filed for bankruptcy under the U.S. Bankruptcy Code. In November 2012, the US Securities and Exchange Commission revoked the registration of the CMED registered securities.

In 2009, an anonymous letter alleging possible illegal and fraudulent activities by management since 2007 was sent to KPMG Hong Kong, then CMED's auditor. The CMED Audit Committee retained law firm Paul Weiss Rifkind Wharton & Garrison, which in 2009 investigated the allegations and advised the committee as to any appropriate further measures. In September 2015, U.S. District Judge Ronnie Abrams of the US District Court for the Southern District of New York held that Paul Weiss-despite its refusal-must give CMED's liquidator, who was scrutinizing the alleged $355 million fraud, otherwise-privileged information concerning Paul Weiss's internal investigation.

In January 2012, a class action fraud lawsuit was filed by CMED investors against CMED and its CEO and CFO in the US District Court for the Southern District of New York. In July 2012, original purchasers of the CMED bonds sued the CEO in a civil case in California, alleging he stripped assets from CMED. In November 2012, the liquidator filed a complaint with the Hong Kong Police Force and the US Federal Bureau of Investigation (FBI), alleging that $400 million that CMED raised in stock and bond sales has gone missing, and that the CEO's wife had gambled substantial sums at the Wynn and Bellagio casinos in Las Vegas, Nevada. In March 2017, the U.S. Department of Justice in Brooklyn, New York, criminally indicted CMED's founder and CEO, as well as CMED's former Chief Financial Officer, charging them with securities fraud and wire fraud conspiracy for stealing more than $400 million from investors as part of a seven-year scheme. In November 2017, several partners of KPMG, CMED's auditor from 2003 to 2008, faced contempt proceedings in Hong Kong High Court with regard to KPMG's refusal honor a February 2016 court order to produce Chinese working papers to the liquidators.

== Business ==
The company is a Cayman Islands corporation, incorporated in 2004, based in China that purported to develop, manufacture and market high intensity focused ultrasound therapy systems ("Model: FEP-BY02"), advanced in vitro diagnostic ("IVD") products using enhanced chemiluminescence ("ECLIA") technology, fluorescent in-situ hybridization ("FISH") technology, and surface plasmon resonance ("SPR") technology to detect and monitor various diseases and disorders.

The ECLIA business purported to consist of ECLIA analyzer and reagent kits, as an IVD system based on ECLIA technology. The reagent kits were purported to detect various thyroid disorders, diabetes, hepatitis, Down syndrome, liver fibrosis, disorders related to reproduction and growth, and various types of tumors.

The FISH business, which purported to consist of FISH imaging analyzer and FISH probes, purported to be a molecular diagnostic system based on FISH technology. FISH probes were purported to be molecular diagnostic reagents used with FISH imaging analyzer for the prenatal and postnatal diagnosis of various genetic diseases, and for the early detection and prognosis of various cancers.

The SPR business, which purported to consist of SPR system and HPV-DNA chips, purported to be a molecular diagnostic system based on SPR technology. The HPV-DNA chips purported to be label-free DNA chips for the diagnosis of HPV infection and genotyping of HPV.

== Securities ==
In August 2005, CMED registered its ordinary shares pursuant to the US Securities Exchange Act of 1934 and registered an initial public offering of American Depositary Shares ("ADSs"), which were quoted on the NASDAQ National Market. CMED raised $677 million through bond issuances and the 2005 initial public offering.

In 2006, after Nasdaq Stock Market LLC became a registered national securities exchange, the ordinary shares became registered pursuant to the Exchange Act, and the ADSs became listed on the Nasdaq Global Select Market ("Nasdaq"). Credit Suisse and Morgan Stanley underwrote a CMED share offering in 2008, and Credit Suisse handled a CMED $150 million debt offering that year. CMED raised $677 million in stock and bond sales between August 2005 and December 2010.

On 14 March 2012, Nasdaq filed a form pursuant to which the China Medical ADSs were delisted effective 26 March 2012, and the ordinary shares were deregistered effective 12 June 2012. On 9 November 2012, the US Securities and Exchange Commission revoked the registration of the company's registered securities. China Medical Technologies ADSs are currently quoted on OTC Link (formerly the "pink sheets") operated by OTC Markets Group Inc., and quote under the ticker symbol "CMEDY."

== Bankruptcy ==
Since 27 July 2012, pursuant to an Order by the Grand Court of the Cayman Islands, CMED has been under the control of Joint Official Liquidators. The CMED liquidators are Cayman-Islands-based Krys & Associates, and Hong Kong's Borrelli Walsh. The liquidators allege that "CMED's creditors and equity holders may have been the victims of a massive multi-year fraud" involving "fraudulent transfers" of assets, and that much of CMED's money was missing.

On 31 August 2012, the company filed in New York City for foreign firm bankruptcy protection under Chapter 15 of the U.S. Bankruptcy Code. CMED listed $500 million in assets and debt. A petition to wind up CMED was also filed in Hong Kong in 2012.

== Alleged fraud and litigation ==
In 2009, three years prior to CMED's filing for bankruptcy, an anonymous letter alleging possible illegal and fraudulent activities by management since 2007 was sent to KPMG Hong Kong, then CMED's auditor. In response, at KPMG's request, in 2009 the CMED Audit Committee retained law firm Paul Weiss Rifkind Wharton & Garrison to investigate the allegations and advise the committee as to any appropriate further measures. Paul Weiss as part of its investigation conducted on-site visits and interviews in China and collected documents from employees and servers of CMED. CMED announced the substantial completion of the independent internal investigation on 30 July 2009.

In early 2012, CMED ceased operating and left investors unpaid on $426 million worth of bond debt, as a result of a suspected fraud by CMED's former Chairman & CEO. In January 2012, a class action fraud lawsuit was filed by CMED investors against CMED and its CEO and CFO in the US District Court in the Southern District of New York. In July 2012, original purchasers of the CMED bonds sued the CEO in a civil case in California, alleging he stripped assets from CMED.

Post-bankruptcy filing, CMED's liquidator found itself probing an alleged $355 million insider fraud. In November 2012, the liquidator filed a complaint to the Hong Kong Police Force and the US Federal Bureau of Investigation (FBI) alleging that $400 million that CMED raised in stock and bond sales had gone missing, and that the CEO's wife had gambled substantial sums at the Wynn and Bellagio casinos in Las Vegas, Nevada. Two of CMED's creditors said the CEO's wife gambled $62 million in slot machines at the Bellagio casino in Las Vegas between 2008 and 2012. Creditors' law firm Stroock & Stroock & Lavan said the wife's tax returns for 2009-11 showed $17 million of "gambling winnings" as income, along with matching "gambling losses", as to which the lawyers said: "This huge 'gambling' cash flow is inconsistent with [the wife]'s banking records and gives rise to a strong suspicion that [she] may have engaged in money laundering and tax evasion." Subsequently, the liquidators increased their estimate of missing cash to $670 million.

Paul Weiss refused to give CMED's liquidator documents relating to its investigation as to which Paul Weiss claimed privilege. In September 2015, US District Judge Ronnie Abrams of the US District Court for the Southern District of New York held that Paul Weiss must give CMED's liquidator, Kenneth Krys, who was scrutinizing the alleged $355 million CMED fraud, otherwise-privileged information concerning Paul Weiss's internal investigation. Judge Abrams held that while audit committees play a critical role in monitoring corporate management and a corporation's auditor pre-bankruptcy, the justifications for protecting attorney-client communications "dissipate in bankruptcy."

In March 2017, the U.S. Department of Justice in Brooklyn, New York, criminally indicted CMED founder and CEO Xiaodong Wu, as well as former Chief Financial Officer Tak Yung Samson Tsang, charging them with securities fraud and wire fraud conspiracy for stealing more than $400 million from investors as part of a seven-year scheme. They were alleged to have lied about how they would spend the proceeds of note offerings from January 2005 to November 2012, saying they would be used for general corporate purposes, to buy businesses and technologies and to repurchase outstanding notes, while in fact the two men diverted more than $400 million to entities they controlled. Wu and Tsang also allegedly halted public disclosures of material events affecting CMED's securities and stopped making interest payments. The note offerings allegedly were based on intellectual property that was over two decades old, off-patent, and had little value. FBI Assistant Director-in-Charge William Sweeney said "Wu and Tsang led their victims down a narrow path of deceit. They betrayed the trust of those who took them at their word, stole their money, and made off with more than $400 million." The case was assigned to US District Judge Kiyo A. Matsumoto of the US District Court for the Eastern District of New York.

In November 2017, 91 partners of the auditor KPMG faced contempt proceedings in Hong Kong High Court, as CMED liquidators took action against KPMG with regard to its refusal honor a February 2016 court order to produce Chinese working papers, correspondence, and records to the liquidators. The liquidators are asking that 91 defendants be held in contempt of court, which could result in criminal penalties, or weekly fines. KPMG had issued written audit reports for CMED from 2003 to 2008, and was replaced by PwC Zhong Tian in August 2009. "Perhaps locking up 91 KPMG partners over Christmas may spur the firms to find a solution to this problem", said Professor Paul Gillis of Peking University's Guanghua School of Management.
