= James Marwick =

British businessman (1862–1936)

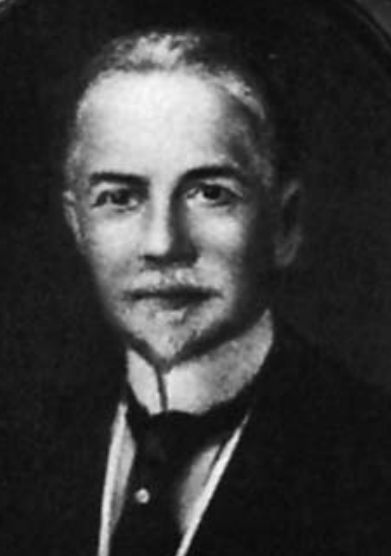
James Marwick (1862–1936)

James Marwick (1862–1936) was a Scottish American and an original founder of an accounting office that became one of the Big Four accounting firms, KPMG.

== Career ==
Marwick was born in Edinburgh, Scotland, in 1862. Marwick's father was Sir James David Marwick, an Orcadian who was Town Clerk of Glasgow from 1873 to 1904. The young Marwick qualified as a chartered accountant, and began his accounting practice in Glasgow, and travelled to Australia to conduct a bank examination for a group of Scottish investors during the Australian banking crisis of 1893.

Marwick later travelled from Australia to Canada and, impressed with business opportunities in North America and cultivating banking clients, he went to the United States in 1894 and began looking for a partner.

Marwick and Roger Mitchell, schoolmates from the University of Glasgow, literally ran into each other on a New York City street in 1897. Mitchell had been sent to the United States to run the family textile business. The two set up a practice together in what has been labelled the perfect "front office/back office partnership."

After opening Marwick, Mitchell & Company in New York, Marwick began traveling to other cities, opening offices all over the United States. Percy Garrett, who ran the London office, once wrote that the tireless Marwick travelled as many as 15,000 miles a year.

Marwick retired in 1917, handing the reins to Mitchell, who took over as senior partner and stayed on until 1925 when the firm joined with William Barclay Peat & Co. to form Peat, Marwick & Mitchell.

Marwick's legacy continues with the appointment of the James Marwick Professor-in-Residence at KPMG: the role is normally filled by a leading academic.
