= KPMG =

British multinational professional services and accounting company

KPMG International Limited
- Type: Company limited by guarantee
- Industry: Professional services
- Founded: 1987; 39 years ago; (merger of Peat Marwick International and Klynveld Main Goerdeler); 1979 (KMG); 1925 (Peat Marwick); 1897 (Marwick, Mitchell & Company)
- Founders: William Barclay Peat; James Marwick; Piet Klijnveld; Roger Mitchell; Jaap Kraayenhof; Reinhard Goerdler; Thompson McLintock; Frank Wilber Main
- Headquarters: 15 Canada Square; London, England, UK
- Area served: Worldwide
- Key people: Gary Wingrove (Global Chairman and CEO)
- Services: Actuarial; Assurance; Financial/Legal/Tax advice; Consulting
- Revenue: ▲US$38.4 billion (2024)
- Number of employees: 275,288 (2024)
- Website: kpmg.com

KPMG is a multinational professional services network headquartered in London, England. It is one of the Big Four accounting firms, alongside Deloitte, EY and PwC. As of December 2024, KPMG is operated as a network of 46 firms across 145 countries, employing 275,288 people that are affiliated with KPMG International Limited, a private English company limited by guarantee.

The name "KPMG" stands for "Klynveld Peat Marwick Goerdeler". The initialism was chosen when KMG (Klynveld Main Goerdeler) merged with Peat Marwick in 1987.

KPMG has three main divisions: financial audit, tax, and consulting. Its tax and advisory services are further divided into various service groups. In the 21st century, various firms within KPMG's global network of affiliates have been involved in regulatory actions and lawsuits.

== History ==
=== Early years and mergers ===
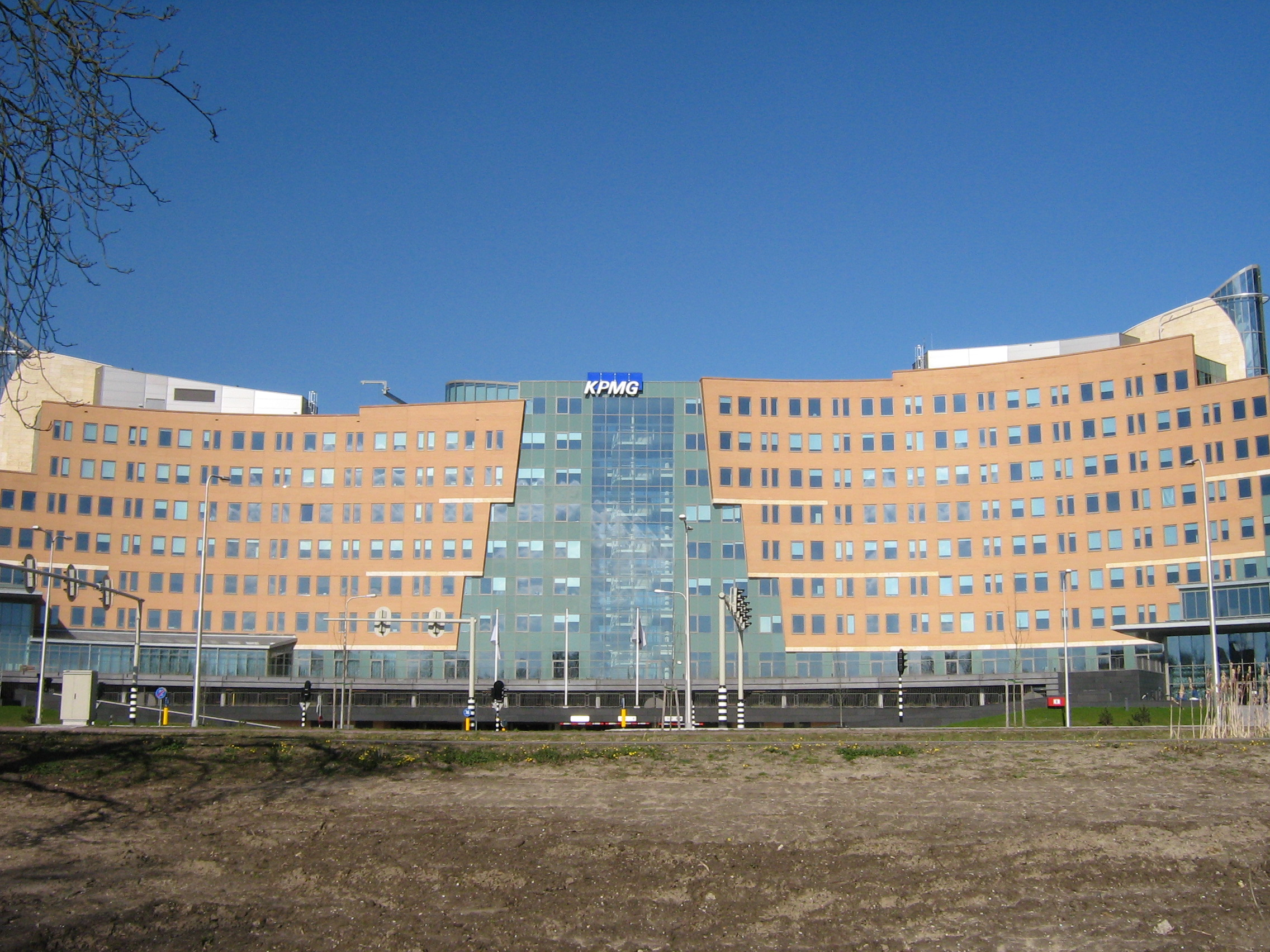
KPMG office in Amstelveen, Netherlands

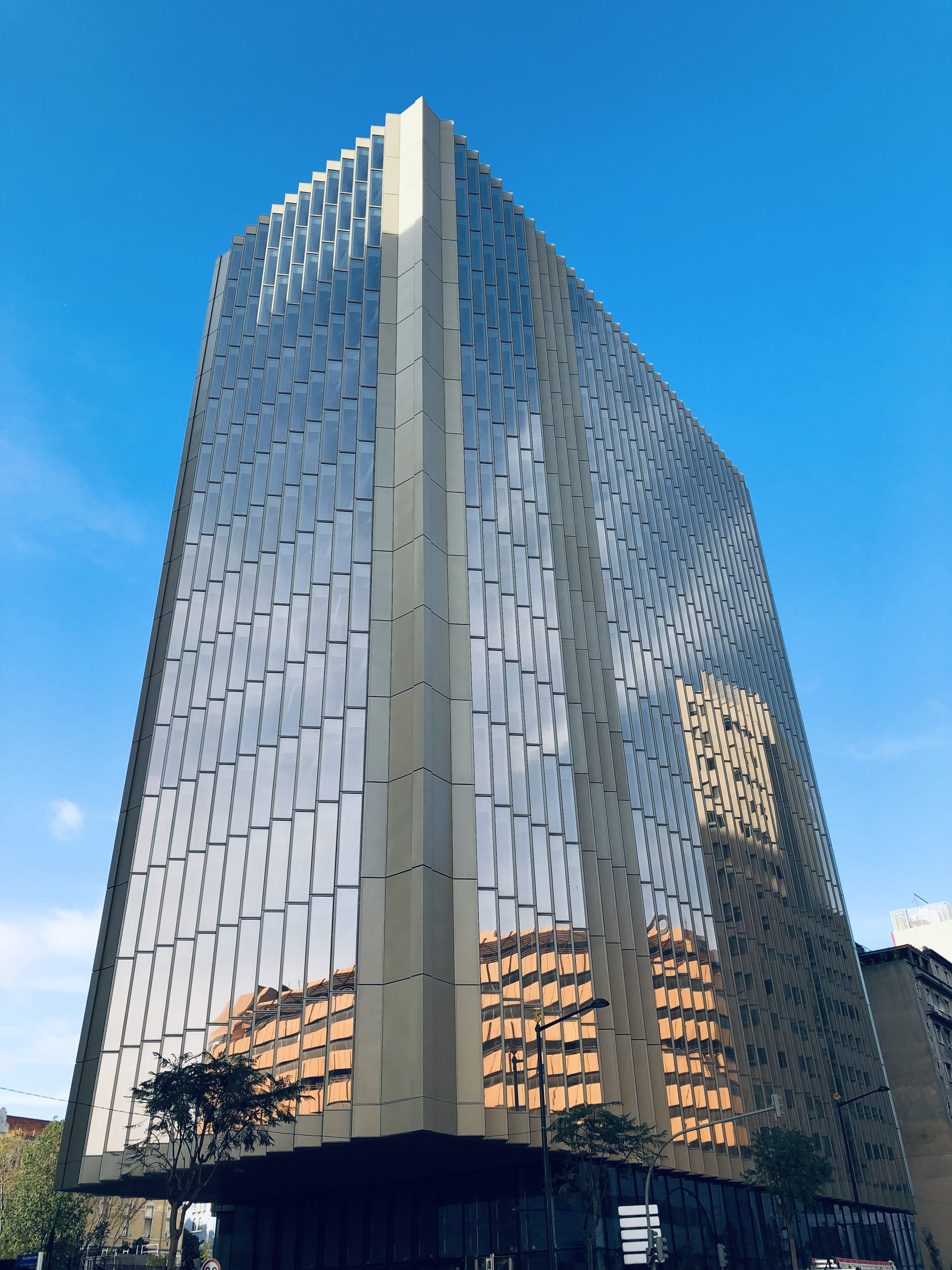
KPMG offices at FPM41, Lisbon, Portugal

In 1816, Robert Fletcher started working as an accountant, and in 1839 the firm he worked for changed its name to Robert Fletcher & Co. William Barclay Peat joined the firm in 1870 at 17 and became head of the firm in 1891, renamed William Barclay Peat & Co. by then. In 1877, Thomson McLintock founded Thomson McLintock & Co in Glasgow. In 1897, Marwick Mitchell & Co. was founded by James Marwick and Roger Mitchell in New York City. In 1899, Ferdinand William LaFrentz founded the American Audit Company in New York. In 1923, the American Audit Company was renamed FW LaFrentz & Co.

In about 1913, Frank Wilber Main founded Main & Co. in Pittsburgh. In March 1917, Piet Klijnveld and Jaap Kraayenhof opened an accounting firm called Klynveld Kraayenhof & Co. in Amsterdam.

In 1925, William Barclay Peat & Co. and Marwick Mitchell & Co., merged to form Peat Marwick Mitchell & Co. Peat Marwick Mitchell & Co. was based at No. 11 Ironmonger Lane in London, before moving to Puddle Dock in London in 1976.

In 1963, Main LaFrentz & Co was formed by the merger of Main & Co and FW LaFrentz & Co. In 1969, Thomson McLintock and Main LaFrentz merged to form McLintock Main LaFrentz International, and McLintock Main LaFrentz International absorbed the general practice of Grace, Ryland & Co. (Note: In 1818, John Moxham opened a company in Bristol. James Grace and James Grace Jr. bought John Moxham & Co. and renamed it James Grace & Son in 1857. In 1861, Henry Grace joined James Jr., and the company was renamed James & Henry Grace; the firm evolved to become Grace, Ryland & Co.)

In 1979, Klynveld Kraayenhof & Co. (Netherlands), McLintock Main LaFrentz (United Kingdom / United States), and Deutsche Treuhand-Gesellschaft (Germany) formed KMG (Klynveld Main Goerdeler) as a grouping of independent national practices to create a strong European-based international firm. Deutsche Treuhand-Gesellschaft CEO Reinhard Goerdeler became the first CEO of KMG. In the United States, Main Lafrentz & Co. merged with Hurdman and Cranstoun to form Main Hurdman & Cranstoun.

In 1987, KMG and Peat Marwick joined forces in the first mega-merger of large accounting firms and formed a firm called KPMG in the United States and most of the rest of the world and Peat Marwick McLintock in the United Kingdom. From 1984 Peat Marwick was the first, largest, and for some time the only large corporate customer of the Apple Macintosh, and the combined company retained the computer.

In the Netherlands, due to the merger between PMI and KMG in 1988, PMI tax advisors joined Meijburg & Co. (The tax advisory agency Meijburg & Co. was founded by Willem Meijburg, Inspector of National Taxes, in 1939). Today, the Netherlands is the only country with two member firms of KPMG International: KPMG Audit (accountants) and Meijburg & Co (tax consultants).

In 1991, the firm was renamed KPMG Peat Marwick, and in 1999, the name was reduced again to KPMG. (Note: KPMG derived from predecessor company founders: Piet Klijnveld, William Barclay Peat, James Marwick, and Reinhard Goerdeler.) In October 1997, KPMG and Ernst & Young announced they would merge. However, while the merger to form PwC was granted regulatory approval, the KPMG/Ernst & Young tie-up was later abandoned.

=== Recent history ===
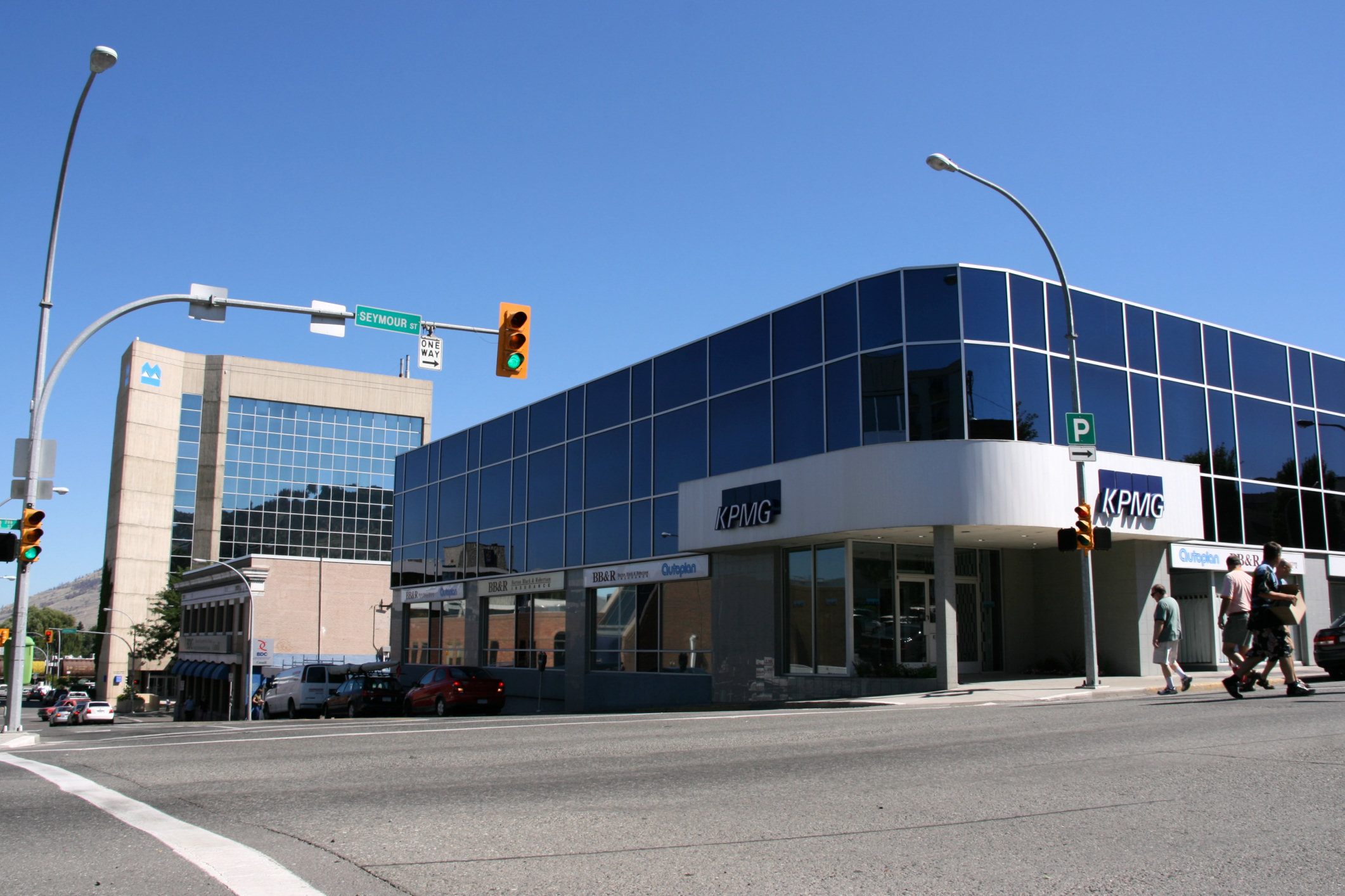
KPMG building in Kamloops, British Columbia, Canada

In 2001, KPMG spun off its United States consulting firm through an initial public offering (IPO) of KPMG Consulting, rebranded as BearingPoint. In early 2009, BearingPoint filed for Chapter 11 bankruptcy protection. The UK and Dutch consulting arms were sold to Atos in 2002. In 2003, KPMG divested itself of its legal arm, Klegal and sold its Dispute Advisory Services to FTI Consulting.

KPMG's member firms in the United Kingdom, Germany, Switzerland and Liechtenstein merged to form KPMG Europe LLP in October 2007. These member firms were followed by 15 other countries. The firm appointed John Griffith-Jones and Ralf Nonnenmacher as joint chairmen. In 2008, CollegeGrad.com ranked KPMG as the most preferred employer among the Big Four accounting firms. It was also ranked No. 4 on the list of "50 Best Places to Launch a Career" in 2009 according to Bloomberg Businessweek.

In 2020, KPMG International Limited was incorporated in London, England. In February 2021, Bill Michael resigned as chairman of KPMG UK following criticism of remarks he made during an internal meeting. Bina Mehta, a senior partner, was appointed acting chair, while Mary O'Connor became acting senior partner and chief executive, making her the first woman to lead the firm in the UK. Two months later, O'Connor left the firm after being passed over for the permanent role, which went to Jon Holt.

In November 2021, KPMG UK revised its partnership structure to introduce five tiers of partnership, with required capital contributions ranging from £150,000 to £500,000. This, along with the £115 million proceeds from the sale of its pensions business earlier in 2021, which it seems was not distributed to the partners, was intended to prepare the balance sheet for a potential large fine (up to £1 billion) arising out of the Carillion lawsuit.

In April 2022, it was announced that KPMG will acquire 50% of the UK-based venture capital advisory specialist Acceleris subject to approval from the Financial Conduct Authority. In August 2022, KPMG announced plans to downsize its office footprint in New York City in 2025, when it moves its offices in the city from Midtown Manhattan to Two Manhattan West in Hudson Yards.

In May 2024, KPMG partners approved the merger of its UK and Switzerland firms, which are working across audit, legal, tax, and advisory, and generating $4.4 billion annually.

In November 2024, KPMG announced that it would spend $100 million over the next four years to boost its enterprise artificial intelligence services via a partnership with Alphabet's Google Cloud. This is an attempt to leverage Google products in the workplace, develop AI agents and overall make the workforce familiar with the technology.

In February 2025, KPMG US removed from its website the diversity reports it had been publishing since 2020 as part of a broader effort to abandon the firm's DEI targets.

In April 2026, KPMG announced it was cutting roughly 10% of its U.S. audit partners (around 100 partners) following a multi-year voluntary early retirement push that had fallen short of targets, despite the fact that its U.S. audit business was growing. The firm stated the layoffs were intended to align the size of its partner ranks with the scale of its audit business rather than to address individual performance. At the time, KPMG's U.S. audit practice included about 1,400 partners and managing directors, with managing directors excluded from the cuts.

== Global structure ==
Each national KPMG firm is an independent legal entity and is a member of KPMG International Limited, a UK Limited Company incorporated in London, United Kingdom. KPMG International changed its legal structure from a Swiss Verein to a co-operative under Swiss law in 2003 and to a limited company in 2020. This structure in which the Limited company provides support services only to the member firms is similar to other professional services networks. The member firms provide the services to the client. The purpose is to limit the liability of each independent member. Until September 2026, KPMG's global chairman was Bill Thomas, former senior partner and CEO of Canadian member firm KPMG LLP. He was succeeded by Gary Wingrove. Some KPMG member firms are registered as multidisciplinary entities that also provide legal services in certain jurisdictions. In India, where regulations do not permit foreign auditing firms to operate, KPMG is licensed as an investment bank and carries out audits under the name of BSR & Co, an auditing firm KPMG purchased after the 1992 liberalisation of the Indian economy. During March 2022, in response to the Russian invasion of Ukraine, KPMG announced that their Russian and Belarusian firms would leave the KPMG network.

== Services ==
KPMG is organised into the following three service lines that generated $38.4 billion in revenue (the 2024 revenue shares are listed in parentheses):

- Audit ($13.4 billion)
- Advisory ($16.3 billion)
- Tax and Legal Services ($8.7 billion)

Tax arrangements relating to tax avoidance and multinational corporations and Luxembourg which were negotiated by KPMG became public in 2014 in the so-called Luxembourg Leaks.

== Lawsuits ==
=== Tax shelter fraud ===
In 2003, the U.S. Internal Revenue Service issued summonses to KPMG seeking information about certain tax shelters and their investors. In February 2004, the United States Department of Justice (USDOJ) opened a criminal inquiry. The USDOJ accused the U.S. member firm, KPMG LLP, of fraud in marketing tax shelters. KPMG dismissed or required the retirement of more than a dozen partners and employees who were involved. KPMG LLP admitted criminal wrongdoing in creating fraudulent tax shelters to help wealthy clients avoid $2.5 billion in taxes between 1996 and 2002, and agreed to pay $456 million in penalties to avoid indictment. Under the deferred prosecution agreement, KPMG LLP did not face criminal prosecution in exchange for complying with the terms of its agreement. On 3 January 2007, the criminal conspiracy charges against KPMG were dropped.

=== Microsoft tax evasion ===
In 2012, KPMG brokered a deal for Microsoft with the government of Puerto Rico to give them a tax rate of nearly 0%, allowing Microsoft to sell its intellectual property to a 85-person local factory. It took years for the IRS to unravel the scheme, a "Rube Goldberg machine that channeled at least $39 billion in profits to Puerto Rico".

=== HBOS audit role ===
The HBOS accounts were published in February 2008 and six months later HBOS had to be rescued by Lloyds Bank. One reason for undertaking an investigation into the audit was that the audit did not reveal the HBOS Reading branch fraud. HBOS, and subsequently Lloyds Bank, accountant Sally Masterton wrote the Project Lord Turnbull Report which described how the Bank and other organizations reacted to the Reading Branch fraud and was highly critical of the firm. However, the audit was investigated by the FRC which concluded, "there was not a realistic prospect that a tribunal would make an adverse finding against KPMG in respect of the matters within the scope of the investigation", and "The firm's work did not fall significantly short of the standards reasonably to be expected of the audit, the test that a tribunal would apply".

=== Carillion audit role ===
In January 2018, it was announced that KPMG, auditor of collapsed UK construction firm Carillion, would have its role examined by the Financial Reporting Council (FRC), and it was summoned to give evidence before two House of Commons select committees on 22 February 2018. The final report of the Parliamentary inquiry into Carillion's collapse, published on 16 May 2018, criticised KPMG for its "complicity" in the company's financial reporting practices. In January 2019, KPMG announced it had suspended the partner that led Carillion's audit and three members of his team; in August 2021, an FRC disciplinary panel was scheduled for 10 January 2022 to hear a formal complaint against KPMG and former KPMG partner Peter Meehan regarding the provision of allegedly false and misleading information concerning the 2016 Carillion audit.

The tribunal convened to hear the formal complaint started on 10 January 2022. At the disciplinary hearing, KPMG's UK chief executive Jon Holt said the firm had discovered misconduct by it staff in its own internal investigations, and immediately reported it to the FRC. Following the FRC tribunal, KPMG was fined £14.4m (one of the biggest penalties in UK audit history) for misconduct relating to its audit of Carillion and another firm, and received a "severe reprimand" from the regulator. KPMG were also ordered to pay £3.95m in costs.

The tribunal heard allegations that KPMG staff created false meeting minutes and retroactively edited spreadsheets before sharing them. A further tribunal will consider penalties for individual KPMG staff, including partner Peter Meehan; the FRC recommended that he be banned for 15 years and fined at least £400,000. In July 2022, it was announced that he had been fined £250,000 and banned for ten years; three other former KPMG executives also received fines and lengthy bans. A junior member of KPMG staff, Pratik Paw—who, aged 25, had been the most junior member of the Carillion audit team—faced a "life changing" fine of £50,000 and a four-year ban, prompting critics to suggest that accounting firms should enable junior colleagues to challenge their superiors, so that low ranking workers are not blamed for accounting scandals. Ultimately, Paw was not fined or suspended but was severely reprimanded.

The FRC opened a second investigation into how KPMG audited Carillion's accounts. The FRC's first report, which found a number of breaches, was delivered to KPMG in September 2020; the FRC was awaiting a KPMG response before deciding whether to take enforcement action. In March 2021, KPMG was reported to be "inching towards a financial settlement with regulators" over its auditing of Carillion, with the FRC expected to impose a record fine, possibly around £25m, on KPMG for its failings.

In May 2020, the FT reported that the Official Receiver was preparing to sue KPMG for £250m over alleged negligence in its audits of Carillion. In May 2021, the liquidator secured funding for its legal action, with speculation that the likely damages claim could be as much as £2 billion. In February 2022, Sky News reported the Official Receiver's claim would be in the range of £1bn-£1.5bn, with one source suggesting around £1.2bn. The OR's negligence claim focuses on the value of major contracts which were not properly accounted for in audits in 2014, 2015 and 2016, resulting in misstatements in excess of £800m within Carillion's financial reports. KPMG was said to have accepted management explanations for inflated revenue and understated cost positions. The OR had received legal advice that KPMG was answerable to Carillion's creditors for a portion of their losses. KPMG said: "We believe this claim is without merit and we will robustly defend the case. Responsibility for the failure of Carillion lies solely with the company's board and management, who set the strategy and ran the business." The claim, for £1.3 billion (US$1.77 billion), accused KPMG of missing "red flags" during audits of Carillion, in one of the largest claims against an audit firm.

In November 2022, the OR said KPMG had "failed to respond" to Carillion allegations that it had failed to properly audit the accounting of 20 significant construction contracts. KPMG reiterated that Carillion's failure was solely the fault of the company's board and management. In February 2023, The Guardian reported that KPMG had settled the £1.3bn lawsuit brought by Carillion's liquidators; details of the settlement were not made public.

In October 2023, the Financial Reporting Council fined KPMG UK £21 million, saying it had failed to follow "the most basic and fundamental audit concepts" and an "unusually large number of breaches" had been found. For three years before the collapse Carillion was not subject to reliable audits. KPMG UK will also pay legal costs of about £5.3 million. The previous year a £14.4m penalty had been imposed on KPMG UK for providing misleading information to the regulator.

=== 2017 South African corruption scandal ===
In 2017, KPMG was embroiled in related scandals involving the Gupta family. KPMG, whose history in South Africa dated back to 1895, and which had been part of the international organization since its founding in 1979, faced calls for closure, and an uncertain future, as a consequence of the damage done to the South African economy as a result of its activities.

KPMG had been working with a Gupta family company in the mining sector, Oakbay Resources and Energy, for 15 years prior to the revelations of corruption and collusion in 2016, at which point KPMG resigned. The full impact and financial profit that KPMG received is yet to be determined; however, at least one large company has terminated its services with KPMG due to its relationship with Oakbay.

In July 2017, after controversial documents were leaked by the AmaBhungane Centre for Investigative Journalism, former chief executive of KPMG South Africa and the former partner that was responsible for audits related to the Gupta family, Moses Kgosana, withdrew from becoming the chairman of Alexander Forbes, a financial services firm.

In 2015, KPMG issued a controversial report that implicated former Finance Minister Pravin Gordhan in the creation of an illegal intelligence gathering unit of the South African Revenue Service (SARS). This report was seen by elements of the media to be part of a wider Gupta-linked state capture conspiracy, with the aim of forcing Gordhan out of his post. The report was withdrawn by KPMG in September 2017, earning the ire of the Commissioner of SARS, Tom Moyane.

After an internal investigation that found work done for the Gupta family fell "considerably short" of the firm's standards and amid rising political and public backlash, KPMG's senior leadership in South Africa, including its chairman Ahmed Jaffer, CEO Trevor Hoole, COO Steven Louw, and five partners, resigned in September 2017.

Save South Africa, a civil-society group, accused KPMG and UK PR firm Bell Pottinger of playing a "central role in facilitating state capture". Numerous South African companies either fired KPMG in the immediate aftermath of the scandal, or were reconsidering their relationships with the firm with the international chairman of KPMG, John Veihmeyer, apologising for the conduct of the South African arm and the firm pledged to donate fees earned from Gupta businesses, as well as the withdrawn SARS report, to anti-corruption activities.

=== Other cases ===
2003

KPMG agreed to pay $125 million and $75 million to settle lawsuits stemming from the firm's audits of Rite Aid and Oxford Health Plans Inc., respectively.

2004

KPMG agreed to pay $115 million to settle lawsuits stemming from the collapse of software company Lernout & Hauspie Speech Products NV.

2005

During August, KPMG LLP admitted to criminal wrongdoing and agreed to pay US$456 million in fines, restitution, and penalties as part of an agreement to defer prosecution of the firm, according to the US Justice Department and the Internal Revenue Service. In addition to the agreement, nine individuals, including six former KPMG partners and the former deputy chairman of the firm, were to be criminally prosecuted. As alleged in a series of charging documents, the fraud relates to the design, marketing, and implementation of fraudulent tax shelters.

2006

American real estate financing firm Fannie Mae sued KPMG for malpractice for approving years of erroneous financial statements.

2007

In February, KPMG Germany was investigated for ignoring questionable payments in the Siemens bribery case. In November 2008, the Siemens Supervisory Board recommended changing auditors from KPMG to Ernst & Young.

In February, KPMG Mauritius was sued by a group of South African pensioners who lost millions when investing in Leaderguard Spot Forex (LSF), a foreign exchange investment scheme backed by KPMG and Denmark-based Saxo Bank. The suit against KPMG was just for the portion lost during their involvement.

2008

In March, KPMG was accused of enabling "improper and imprudent practices" at New Century Financial, a failed mortgage company, and KPMG agreed to pay $80 million to settle suits from Xerox shareholders over manipulated earnings reports.

In December, it was announced that two of Tremont Group's Rye Select funds, audited by KPMG, had $2.37 billion invested with the Madoff "Ponzi scheme". Class action suits were filed.

In March 2008, KPMG employees in the UK and South Africa were accused of bribing and recruiting employees of commercial structures to collect trade secrets for a monetary reward.

2010

In August, it was reported by the Swedish Financial Supervisory Authority to the Swedish accountancy regulator after HQ Bank was forced into involuntary liquidation after the Financial Supervisory Authority revoked all its licences for breach of banking regulations.

2011

In August, KPMG conducted due diligence work on Hewlett-Packard's $11.1 billion acquisition of the British software company Autonomy. In November 2012 HP announced an $8.8 billion write off due to "serious accounting improprieties" committed by Autonomy management prior to the acquisition.

According to an independent panel formed to investigate irregular payments made by Olympus which reported in December, KPMG's affiliate in Japan did not identify fraud at the company.

2013

In April, Scott London, a former KPMG LLP partner in charge of KPMG's US Los Angeles-based Pacific Southwest audit practice, admitted passing on stock tips about clients, including Herbalife, Skechers, and other companies, to his friend Bryan Shaw, a California jewelry-store owner. In return Shaw gave London $70,000 as well as gifts that included a $12,000 Rolex watch and concert tickets. On 6 May, Shaw agreed to plead guilty to one count of conspiracy to commit securities fraud. He also agreed to pay around $1.3 million in restitution, and to cooperate with the government as part of a plea deal with federal prosecutors. This scandal led KPMG to resign as auditor for Herbalife and Skechers.

The Office of Counter-Terrorism and Financial Intelligence of the US Department of the Treasury accused KMPG, Ernst & Young and PwC of collaborating with British intelligence services to provide analytical information on financial transactions and reports of British organizations operating in the United States with contract agreements with government agencies.

2015

KPMG was accused by the Canada Revenue Agency of abetting tax evasion schemes: "The CRA alleges that the KPMG tax structure was in reality a 'sham' that intended to deceive the taxman."

2016

The Canada Revenue Agency offered an amnesty to KPMG clients caught using an offshore tax-avoidance scheme on the Isle of Man.

2017

KPMG US terminated five partners in its audit practice, including the head of its audit practice in the US, after an investigation of advanced confidential knowledge of planned audit inspections by its Public Company Accounting Oversight Board (PCAOB). This followed criticism about KPMG's failure to uncover illegal sales practices at Wells Fargo or potential corruption at FIFA, the governing international body of football. It was reported in 2017 that KPMG had the highest number of deficiencies, among the Big Four, cited by its regulator in the previous two years. This includes two annual inspections that were compromised as a result of advanced access to inspection information. In March 2019, David Middendorf and Jeffrey Wada, co-defendants in the scandal, were convicted.

The UK accounting regulator, the Financial Regulation Council (FRC), has opened an investigation into KPMG's audit of the financial statements of British aerospace company Rolls-Royce plc for the year ended December 2010.

In August, KPMG US paid a $6.2 million fine to the US Securities and Exchange Commission for inadequacies in its audit of the financial statements of oil and gas company, Miller Energy Resources. It also found KPMG guilty of a long list of violations with regard to its audits, including "lack of competence" and "highly unreasonable conduct."

In November, 91 partners of KPMG Hong Kong faced contempt proceedings in Hong Kong High Court, as China Medical Technologies (CMED) liquidators investigating a $400 million fraud took action against KPMG with regard to its refusal to honor a February 2016 court order to produce Chinese working papers, correspondence, and records to the liquidators. The liquidators are asking that 91 defendants be held in contempt of court, which could result in criminal penalties, or weekly fines. KPMG had issued written audit reports for CMED from 2003 to 2008, and was replaced by PwC Zhong Tian in August 2009. "Perhaps locking up 91 KPMG partners over Christmas may spur the firms to find a solution to this problem", said Professor Paul Gillis of Peking University's Guanghua School of Management.

2018

In July, KPMG came under criticism for its role in the bankruptcy of Dubai-based private equity firm Abraaj Group after it was determined that KPMG Lower Gulf Chairman and Chief Executive Vijay Malhotra's son had worked at Abraaj and that an executive named Ashish Dave alternated between stints at KPMG and as Abraaj's chief financial officer, a job he held twice.

Also in July, the Financial Reporting Council (FRC) announced an investigation into KPMG’s work for Conviviality, the British drinks supplier that collapsed into administration during April 2018.

Also in July, KPMG paid HK$650 million (US$84 million) to settle legal claims after failing to identify fraud at a Chinese timber company, China Forestry. The liquidators of China Forestry claimed KPMG was negligent when it failed to detect serious false accounting by some of the company’s top management ahead of its listing in 2009.

In August, Chile's Comision Para El Mercado Financiero (CMF) sanctioned KPMG Auditores Consultores Limitada (KPMG LLP's local affiliate) 3,000 UF (~$114,000), and Joaquín Lira Herreros, its partner, for offences incurred in the audit made to the financial statements of the Aurus Insignia Fondo de Inversión, managed by Aurus Capital S.A. Admnistradora General de Fondos Management (AGF), corresponding to the year 2014.

In November, the Sultanate of Oman's Capital Market Authority (CMA) suspended KPMG from auditing entities regulated by the CMA for a period of one year after discovering major financial and accounting irregularities in the entities' records.

In December, KPMG South Africa published an open apology for its participation in various scandals in South Africa, including publishing a misleading report that led to the resignation of the South African Finance Minister, involvement with the Gupta family who have been implicated in corruption scandal with former President Jacob Zuma, and acting as the auditor of VBS Mutual Bank that collapsed due to fraud. Its top eight staff resigned during 2017 and its workforce shrank from 3,400 to 2,200.

2019

KPMG were fined £5 million by the Financial Reporting Council for misconduct shortly after the takeover of the Britannia Building Society by The Co-operative Bank, particularly relating to the valuation of Britannia's commercial loans and other liabilities. The takeover led to the near collapse of The Co-operative Bank.

KPMG was fined $50 million by the U.S. Securities and Exchange Commission for illicit use of PCAOB data and cheating on training exams.

In June 2019, KPMG was fined $50 million for altering its past audit work after receiving stolen data from accounting industry watch dog PCAOB. KPMG admitted to its mistakes and as a part of its settlement, it also agreed to hire an independent consultant to review its internal controls.

2020

During April, KPMG UK was fined £455,000 and a senior partner, Nicola Quayle, was fined £29,250 by the Financial Reporting Council for failing to challenge what a client was telling them about certain complex supplier arrangements.

In June, KPMG resigned from the auditor role of British fashion firm Ted Baker plc after the company admitted accounting errors resulting in overstatement of its inventory by up to £58 million.

2021

In February, the liquidators for the South African bank VBS Mutual Bank sued KPMG for 863.5 million rand (~US$59 million) over its audit opinion on the now defunct bank.

In March, KPMG US agreed to pay $10 million to settle a 10-year gender discrimination lawsuit in a New York Federal Court that alleged claims by 450 women that its culture was rife with gender discrimination, sexual harassment, and retaliation.

During May, members of the Canadian Parliament's House of Commons finance committee re-launched a probe into offshore tax evasion by interviewing Lucia Iacovelli, managing partner at KPMG.

KPMG in the UK was sued for more than £6 million (~€6.9 million, ~US$7.8 million) by property company Mount Anvil which claims it was left with an unexpected tax bill after the firm provided it with negligent advice.

In July, the Financial Reporting Council (FRC) criticised KPMG for its "unacceptable" failure to meet required standards in its audits of banks for a third year running. Only 61% of KPMG’s audits sampled by the regulator met industry standards.

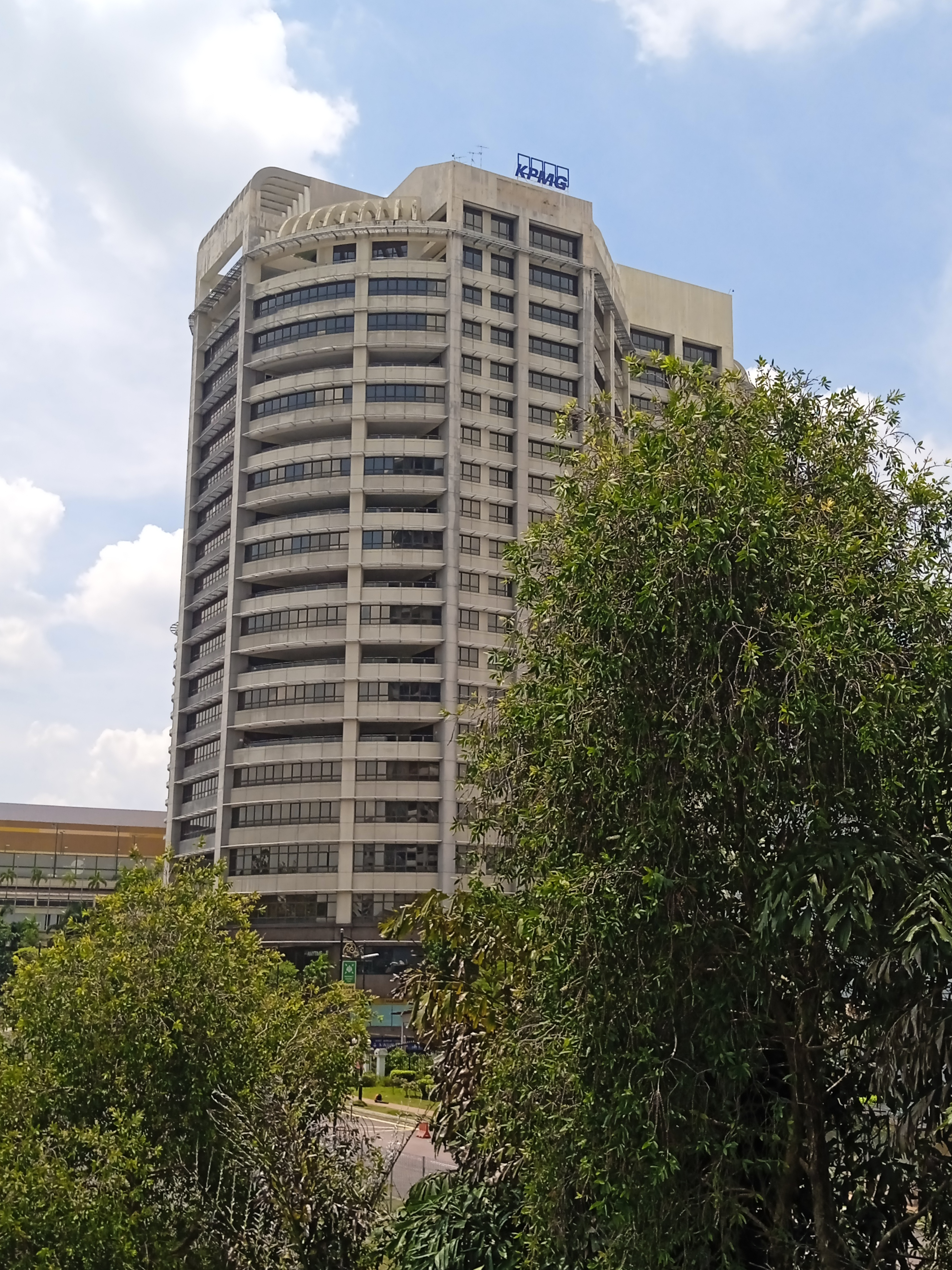
KPMG Tower at Bandar Utama in Petaling Jaya, Selangor, Malaysia

The Government of Malaysia and the state sovereign fund, 1MDB, launched a lawsuit seeking over $5.6 billion in damages from KPMG partners for alleged breaches and negligence linked to a corruption scandal at the fund.

South Africa's largest asset manager, the Public Investment Corporation (PIC), sued KPMG for 144 million rand (~U$9.5 million) it lost when the VBS Mutual Bank went bankrupt as a result of fraud. Its claim is centred on the rights issue and a revolving credit facility it participated in at VBS relying on financial statements audited by KPMG and its former senior partner, Sipho Malaba.

In August, a tribunal convened by the FRC fined KPMG £13m and ordered it to pay £2.75m in costs. This was because of its serious misconduct in the sale of bed company Silentnight. The tribunal found that KPMG had helped private equity group H.I.G Capital drive Silentnight into an insolvency process, so that HIG could acquire the company without its £100m pension scheme. KPMG was severely reprimanded by the tribunal, and was ordered to appoint an independent reviewer to check a sample of previous cases for similar failings. The tribunal ruled that KPMG's involvement with Silentnight was "deeply troubling" as it failed to act solely in its client's interests.

In September, PCAOB fined KPMG Australia $450,000 after it confessed to a cheating scandal involving over 1,100 (almost 12%) of its employees.

In November, the British litigation financing firm Augusta Ventures announced that it would bankroll three $152.4-million lawsuits in Canada against the previous auditor (KPMG LLP), authorized legal adviser (Cassels Brock & Blackwell LLP) and monetary adviser (Canaccord Genuity Corp) of Cash Store Financial Services Inc., a Canadian payday lender that filed for creditor safety in 2014. Bill Aziz, the litigation trustee for Cash Store, said, "It’s alleged in these lawsuits that KPMG, Cassels Brock and Canaccord triggered over $100-million in damages to Cash Store and its collectors."

Also in November, KPMG UK was hit with a £15m lawsuit by insurance outsourcer Watchstone—formerly known as Quindell—over allegations it suffered losses because of the audit firm's negligence in 2013.

Also in November, two units of Abraaj that are now in liquidation filed a lawsuit in Dubai against KPMG LLP for damages of US$600 million alleging that KPMG accountants "failed to maintain independence and an appropriate attitude of professional skepticism," and breached their duty of care when auditing the private-equity firm.

2022

In January, the Malaysian government reported that KPMG's local affiliate had agreed to pay a fine of RM 333 million ($111 million) to settle the case filed against it in connection with the 1MDB funds scandal.

A group of investors in Airbus, the Dutch foundation Stichting Investor Loss Compensation (SILC), filed a lawsuit against Airbus, KPMG and EY in the Hague District Court alleging they suffered damages worth at least €300 million (US$340 million) as a result of the company's misleading publications about its involvement in and financial settlements involving corruption, bribery, and other forms of fraud.

The UK accounting regulator, the Financial Reporting Council (FRC), fined KPMG £3 million for audit failings at collapsed alcohol retailer Conviviality.

A settlement agreement between the Financial Reporting Council and a KPMG partner, Stuart Smith, who led the firm’s audit of IT company Regenersis, later renamed as Blancco Technology Group, resulted in a fine of £150,000 after he admitted misleading its inspectors.

During March, the Financial Reporting Council (FRC) fined KPMG UK £1.3 million for serious failings within their audits of British bar chain, Revolution Bars Group.

The US securities regulator, the Securities Exchange Commission, announced an investigation into conflicts of interest at auditors, including KPMG's US branch, KPMG LLP.

During April, the US accounting regulator, PCAOB, fined the former head of KPMG's US audit practice, Scott Marcello, a record US$100,000 for having failed to reasonably supervise senior auditors who engaged in the scheme to improve KPMG’s inspection results.

During May, the Financial Reporting Council confirmed that KPMG would face a £14.4 million (~US$18 million) fine and a severe reprimand over false representations made by KPMG employees to the regulator concerning Carillion. (See 'Carillion audit role' section below).

In May, The Times reported that the FRC was close to finishing its investigation into KPMG UK's audit of the financial statements of Rolls-Royce plc for the year ended December 2010; the investigation was begun in 2017 and the FRC may fine KPMG UK up to £4.5 million (~US$5.6 million) for questionable audit practices.

In August, the PCAOB, which reviews audit procedures of foreign firms that audit US-listed entities, fined KPMG South Korea US$500,000 for failing to have proper procedures in place to prevent its auditors from doctoring work papers. It also fined two of its partners and banned them from working for a PCAOB registered audit firm for three years, as they were found to have improperly altered documents and violated auditing standards during the Big Four firm’s 2018 audit of the Korean business of an unnamed US-listed company.

In September, a lawsuit was filed in the Hong Kong High Court which accused KPMG of "appalling" audit work that allowed a Chinese medical technology company, China Medical Technologies, to commit a US$400 million accounting fraud, and which sought up to US$830 million in damages.

In October, Dubai Emirate's financial regulator, Dubai Financial Services Authority, handed provisional fines of US$2 million to KPMG's UAE affiliate (US$1.5 million) and one of its audit employees, Milind Navalkar (US$0.5 million), for failing to follow international audit standards in the audit of the failed Dubai-based private equity firm The Abraaj Group.

Also, KPMG affiliate KPMG Lower Gulf's CEO, Nader Haffar, quit consequent to a tumultuous year filled with accusations of nepotism, cronyism and partner discontent. This was a month after Nader had sent a letter to clients in the UAE and Oman in which the firm’s 30 partners said that they remained united.

In addition, the PCAOB fined KPMG's Italian, Dutch and Canadian affiliates approximately US$275,000 for concealing the outsourcing of some audit work to unregulated firms in Poland and Romania.

In November, KPMG UK agreed to pay £5 million (US$6 million) in settlement of a lawsuit by a former client, insurance software firm Quindell, relating to deficient audit work for Quindell (now known as Watchstone) relating to its 2013 financial statements.

The Abu Dhabi Accountability Authority (ADAA), which monitors Abu Dhabi government-owned and related entities, removed KPMG’s Lower Gulf affiliate from its list of authorized auditors that can sign off on financial statements.

In December, the PCAOB announced that its inspectors had discovered that hundreds of KPMG employees in the UK and Colombia affiliates cheated on their compliance exams. In addition, inspectors also discovered document alterations to deceive inspectors in KPMG's Colombia affiliate, and blank audit papers signed by an KPMG affiliate audit partner in India. KPMG LLP agreed to pay US$7.7 million in fines. This follows a US$50 million fine in 2019 where KPMG employees were using data stolen from the PCAOB to identify which audits would be reviewed.

2023

In February, KPMG UK confidentially settled the £1.3 billion (US$1.6 billion) lawsuit launched in 2022 by the UK's Official Receiver relating to KPMG's audit of the failed construction firm, Carillion, between 2014 - 2018.

Also in February, a Disciplinary Tribunal, appointed by the UK's Financial Reporting Council and led by Sir Stanley Burnton, concluded that members of the audit teams deliberately misled the FRC’s Audit Quality Review (AQR) teams about KPMG’s audits of Carillion plc and Regenersis plc by altering existing documents and by creating entirely new documents during the course of the inspection. This showed, the Tribunal found, a clear intention to mislead the regulator.

In April, KPMG Lower Gulf was ordered by a Dubai court to pay 850 million United Arab Emirates dirhams (~US$231 million) to a group of investors who claim they lost money because of poor-quality audits of its client, The Abraaj Group.

Also in April, KPMG’s Canadian affiliate was sued for Canadian $1.4 billion (~US$1.1 billion) by PriceWaterhouseCoopers, the Receiver winding down defunct financing firm Bridging Finance Inc., for negligently failing to detect and report on misstatements in its financial statements before the firm’s collapse in 2021.

Also in April, the Financial Reporting Council fined KPMG's UK affiliate £1 million (~US$1.3 million) for failing to meet audit requirements in the case of the 2020 financial statements of its client, the stationery company TheWorks.co.uk plc, particularly its inventory.

The Financial Reporting Council fined KPMG's UK affiliate £875,000 in April (~US$1.1 million) for failing to meet audit requirements in the case of the 2016 financial statements of its client, lighting company Luceco, particularly with regard to inventory cost errors.

During May, the PCAOB released inspection reports regarding KPMG's China affiliate KPMG Huazhen LLP that Holding Foreign Companies Accountable Act (HFCAA) made possible. It concluded that it discovered "deficiencies of such significance that PCAOB staff believe the audit firm failed to obtain sufficient appropriate audit evidence to support its work on the public company’s financial statements or internal control over financial reporting".

During June, the UK accounting regulator Financial Reporting Council imposed a £877,000 (~US$1.1 million) fine on KPMG's UK affiliate for not satisfying relevant requirements regarding its 2017 audit of the financial statements of the logistics company Eddie Stobart Group.

In July, KPMG Nederland announced that over 100 employees of the Dutch affiliate of KPMG were found to have cheated annually on their exams over the past five years and that its director Marc Hogeboom would also step down as boss of the accounting arm.

In August, KPMG Australia was accused by two whistleblowers of submitting inflated invoices and billing the Australian Department of Defence for hours never worked. KPMG has reportedly charged this department A$1.8 billion (~US$1.2 billion) over the past decade.

Also in August, the registration authority of the Abu Dhabi Global Market imposed a AED110,000 (~US$30,000) penalty on KPMG Lower Gulf for “ineffective systems and controls leading to non-compliance with audit requirements”.

During November, the PCAOB imposed a fine of US$80,000 on KPMG affiliates in Brazil and Argentina for failing to communicate adequately with their client's audit committees, and a US$500,000 fine on its Japanese affiliate for quality control violations.

KPMG was criticized for its audits of three regional American banks which collapsed in 2023: Signature Bank, First Republic Bank, and Silicon Valley Bank (SVB). The United States Senate’s Permanent Subcommittee on Investigations later released a report which noted the inadequate practices by KPMG, though the firm denies the findings.

2024

In late December 2023 an organisation named Collectif Porteurs H2O, that represents 9,000 individual investors in funds managed by French asset manager, H2O, sued its auditor, KPMG's French affiliate, as being jointly liable, along with H2O, its former parent Natixis, and its custodian CACEIS, for the losses of almost €700 million ($764 million) due to investments in illiquid assets tied to German financier Lars Windhorst. The UK financial regulator, Financial Conduct Authority, in August made H2O compensate investors to the extent of €250 million ($273 million) and forced H2O to relinquish its UK license. H2O was separately fined €75 million ($82 million) in 2022 by the French regulator, Autorité des Marchés Financiers (France).

During February, KPMG's South African affiliate is supposed to have entered into a confidential out-of-court settlement of 500 million Rand (~$27 million) with the liquidators of bankrupt South African bank VBS Mutual Bank in response to their lawsuit against KPMG filed in February 2021 for 863.5 million Rand (~$59 million).

In March, KPMG's UK affiliate was fined £1.46 million ($1.9 million) by the Financial Reporting Council for 'basic failings' in its audit of the 2018 financial statements of advertising agency M&C Saatchi plc. FRC indicated that KPMG would have been fined £2.25 million ($2.8 million) had it not admitted to the breaches.

Also in March, the Public Company Accounting Oversight Board sanctioned three partners of KPMG China affiliate KPMG Huazhen LLP for violations of audit standards, and fined it $150,000.

In April, the PCAOB fined KPMG's Netherlands affiliate, KPMG Accountants N.V, US$25 million for violations of its rules and quality control standards relating to the firm’s internal training program and monitoring of its system of quality control. The PCAOB found that widespread improper answer sharing occurred at the firm over a five-year period and that the firm made multiple misrepresentations to the PCAOB about its knowledge of the misconduct.

KPMG has been criticized over its audit for the distressed New York Community Bank (NYCB) in light of its passing audits for three regional banks that failed in 2023.

During August, the National Financial Reporting Authority (NFRA), an independent regulatory body in India that oversees the accounting and auditing of companies, fined KPMG's Indian affiliate, BSR & Associates LLP, 10 crore rupees (~$1.2 million) for lapses in auditing the 2018-19 financial statements of the coffee chain Coffee Day Enterprises and barred two of its partners from audit work for up to ten years. This followed an earlier 2.15 crore rupee (~$0.3 million) fine for similar lapses with a related entity, Coffee Day Global.

2025

During January, the Financial Reporting Council announced that it has opened an investigation into the 2022 audit of the gambling company Entain, which was conducted by KPMG's UK affiliate.

During March, the PCAOB announced nine settled disciplinary orders sanctioning nine firms from KPMG’s global network (Switzerland, Korea, Australia, Canada, Brazil, Italy, Israel, Mexico and UK) for violations of PCAOB rules and standards, including quality control standards. Each firm consented to a PCAOB order that censures the firm and imposes civil money penalties totaling US$3.375 million.

During June, the Financial Reporting Council, announced a fine of £0.69 million (US$0.8 million) on KPMG's UK affiliate as a result of an investigation into auditor independence during the financial audit of UK manufacturing firm Carr’s Group, where KPMG was found to be relying on another firm’s work.

2026

During February, KPMG Australia announced that it has fined one of its Australian partners A$10,000 (approx. US$7,085) for using Artificial Intelligence (AI) technology during his appearance for an internal examination about AI. KPMG Australia indicated that two dozen other employees have been discovered similarly cheating using KPMG's AI technology.

In March, the Ontario Securities Commission commenced enforcement proceedings against KPMG, alleging deficiencies in its audits of certain Bridging Finance Inc. funds that may have affected investor confidence. The OSC's claim alleged that "KPMG failed to perform fundamental audit procedures over the most critical aspect of the financial statements — the valuation of the loans held within each of the funds...”

During May, Andrew Yates, the CEO of KPMG's Australian affiliate and Julian McPherson, head of its audit practice both resigned over allegations of shortcomings in the handling of a whistleblower's complaints, made in 2024, about sharing confidential client data. Chief operating officer Eileen Hoggett was sacked. In July, KPMG Australia appointed John Sams as chief executive, succeeding interim leader Stan Stavros. Sams had served as the firm's chief financial officer since October 2025 and chief operating officer since June 2026.

In July, KPMG's Australian affiliate fined a group of staff and partners as high as A$180,000 (approx. US$126,000) for misusing confidential information from its audit of clients Lendlease and Optus in bids for Dexus, Telstra and Westpac audit contracts. Lendlease announced it would terminate its 68 year audit relationship with KPMG. In August, KPMG Australia's current and former leadership appeared before a parliamentary inquiry in Canberra. The same month it was announced that 400 jobs would be cut, equating to 5% of KPMG's Australian workforce. The Australian subsidiary sought financial support from KPMG International.

During June, KPMG had to withdraw a thought leadership article, "Redefining Excellence in the Age of AI", that was published on its website in October last year because a third-party reviewer, GPTZero, highlighted that only five of its 45 citations correctly pointed to the cited source, a phenomenon known as 'vibe citing'. Companies cited within the KPMG AI report, including UBS, the National Health Service, Swiss Federal Railways and Transport for London all said that the report's statements about their AI usage were either untrue or misleading.

During August, US Federal authorities announced an investigation of a KPMG US employee for betting, using prediction markets, on whether a specific public company would beat the consensus estimate for quarterly earnings.

In August, KPMG Australia sought support from KPMG International to remain solvent: KPMG International considered providing support of about A$200 million.

In October, a review found KPMG Australia had mishandled whistleblower allegations of client data leaks. The report noted the organisation had let cultural and governance weaknesses persist for years. As a result, the federal government will not allow KPMG to bid for new work until February 2028.

== Cultural issues ==
Controversies around KPMG Lower Gulf first emerged in July 2022, when staff at the UAE division accused the multinational firm of neglecting multiple complaints filed against the Emirati CEO Nader Haffar. The controversy resurfaced in September 2022, when the global bosses were urged to suspend Haffar, citing "nepotism, cronyism and a culture of fear" under his leadership. In an email sent to KPMG International’s top executives, ten capital partners at the firm’s UAE branch asked them to address the "massive crisis" in the local company. They also raised concerns over the falling profits, affecting their pay. The average profits per partner fell, and they were not paid bonuses for 2021 due to "cash flow issues".

In October 2022, the Financial Times published a report in which dozens of employees said that unethical employment practices at KPMG Saudi Arabia were commonplace and had left expatriate staff fearing for their personal safety and struggling with their mental health. Several former employees witnessed colleagues being fired abruptly for no reason, and put this down to hostility towards westerners from the largely Arab leadership team at KPMG Saudi Arabia. Racial tensions within the firm were also a problem, with xenophobic language being used towards certain nationalities. The FT viewed copies of three whistleblowing reports sent to KPMG International since 2018, alleging issues in the Saudi Arabia practice, including wrongful terminations, failure to pay staff and concerns about personal safety in the region.

== Sponsorship ==
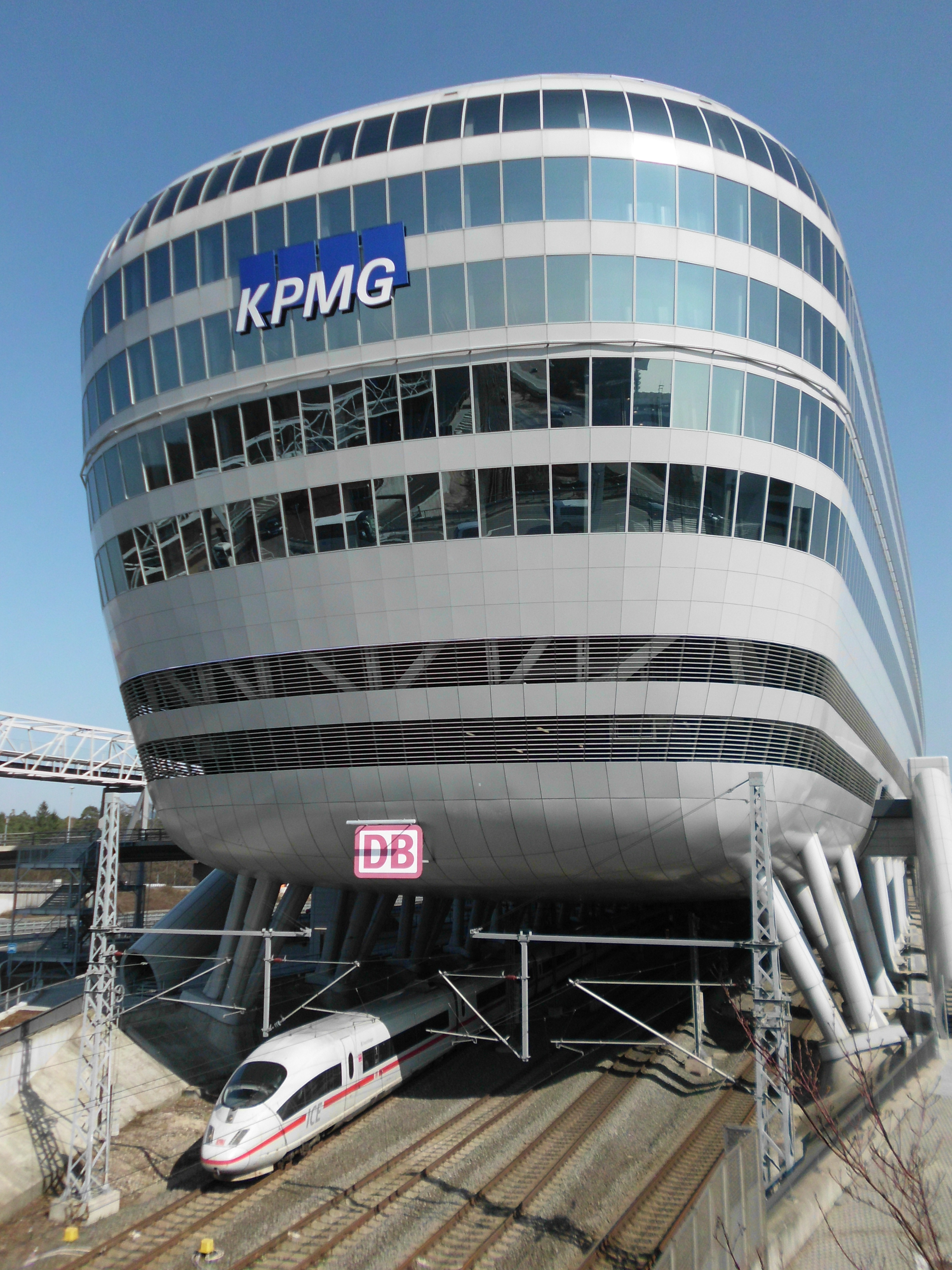
KPMG Europe headquarters in the Squaire building over Frankfurt Airport long-distance station

The Swedish member firm was the main sponsor for Swedish biathlete Magdalena Forsberg, six-time world champion and two-time Olympic medalist. Forsberg was working as a tax consultant at the KPMG Sundsvall office parallel to her athletic career.

In February 2008, Phil Mickelson, ranked one of the best golfers in the world, signed a three-year global sponsorship deal with KPMG. As part of the agreement, Mickelson was to wear the KPMG logo on his headwear during all golf related appearances. The sponsorship lasted until 22 February 2022, when the two parties mutually split following comments in which Mickelson called Saudi Arabia "scary" but said he would overlook the country's human rights controversies in the best interest of the PGA Tour.

The Canadian member firm sponsored skier Alexandre Bilodeau, who won the first gold medal for Canada on home soil in the 2010 Vancouver Olympics. Bilodeau's father is a tax partner in the Montreal office.

In 2014, KPMG and McLaren Technology Group formed a ten-year strategic alliance to apply McLaren Applied Technologies' predictive analytics and technology to KPMG's audit and advisory services. KPMG's logo was also placed at the engine air intake of the McLaren F1 team's cars. KPMG terminated the partnership in 2017 and McLaren signed a similar partnership with competitor Deloitte.

Since 2016, KPMG has been a strategic sponsor of Brain Bar, a Budapest-based, annually held festival on the future.

== Awards ==
KPMG ranked in the top two overall in Consultancy Rankings 2009 by OpRisk & Compliance, in recognition of KPMG's experience in risk management.

In 2011, the company was ranked second on the World's Best Outsourcing Advisors, in recognition of the firm's depth of experience, global reach and holistic approach. That same year, the company was inducted into Working Mother Hall of Fame after being honored for 15 years as one of Working Mother magazine's 100 Best Companies for Working Mothers. KPMG was ranked number 13 in Consulting Magazine's Best Firms to Work for in 2016.

In 2017, KPMG was ranked 29th on the Fortune list of 100 best companies to work for. That same year, KPMG, along with PwC, Deloitte, and PA Consulting Group, were ranked among the UK's 25 top companies to work for.

== Satire ==
In his 2017 program gesternheutemorgen ("yesterdaytodaytomorrow"), the cabaret artist Urban Priol interpreted the acronym KPMG as Kinder Prüfen Mein Geschäft ("Children Auditing My Business").

== See also ==
- Accounting networks and associations
- Big Four accounting firms
- Financial audit
- FTSE 100 Index
- Management consulting
- Professional services
