= Bridging Finance Inc. =

Defunct, fraudulent Canadian private lender, 2012–2021

- Industry: Financial services
- Fate: Receivership (PricewaterhouseCoopers LLP appointed as receiver)
- Headquarters: Toronto, Ontario, Canada
- Key people: David Sharpe, Natasha Sharpe, Jenny Coco, Rock-Anthony Coco, Andrew Mushore, Gary Ng, and Sean McCoshen
- Products: private credit
- Total assets: $2.1 billion CAD (2021)
- Website: www.bridgingfinance.ca

Bridging Finance Inc. was a Canadian private lender based in Toronto, Ontario, Canada that was placed into receivership in April 2021 following an investigation by the Ontario Securities Commission (OSC). Subsequent findings by the Ontario Capital Markets Tribunal determined that former CEO David Sharpe, former Chief Investment Officer Natasha Sharpe and former Chief Compliance Officer, Andrew Mushore engaged in fraud involving undisclosed related-party transactions, diversion of investor funds for personal benefit, and misleading disclosures to investors and regulators.

At its peak, Bridging Finance managed approximately $2.1 billion on behalf of roughly 26,000 investors. Following its collapse, the court-appointed receiver estimated investor losses of approximately $1.3 billion, representing nearly two-thirds of assets under management. That is one of the "largest collapses of an investment fund in Canadian history."

In June 2025, the Ontario Capital Markets Tribunal ordered the three respondents to pay more than $27 million in administrative penalties, disgorgement and costs.

In March 2026, the OSC commenced enforcement proceedings against KPMG, alleging deficiencies in its audits of certain Bridging Finance funds that may have affected investor confidence.

== History and ownership ==
Bridging Finance Inc. was founded in 2012. Bridging was owned by Natasha Sharpe, Jenny Coco and Rocky Coco (the Cocos are brother and sister owners of Coco Paving Inc.) Sharpe worked with the Cocos in a previous role at the Bank of Montreal where she provided commercial banking services to Coco Paving. Sharpe joined the board of directors of the Coco Group in 2011. Subsequently, the Cocos provided capital to launch Bridging in 2012.

In 2019, Natasha Sharpe and other shareholders agreed to sell 50% of Bridging's equity to Gary Ng for $50 million. It was later revealed that Ng paid for the investment with the proceeds of a $32 million loan that he received from one of Bridging's credit funds. This use of client money to fund a capital transaction that benefited Bridging's owners was one of the transactions listed by the OSC when they announced the investigation.

At the time that Bridging was placed in receivership, the Directors of the parent Bridging Finance Inc. were Natasha Sharpe, Jenny Coco, Rock-Anthony Coco and Hugh O'Reilly. The Cocos and O'Reilly resigned as Directors following the appointment of PWC as receiver.

== Conflicts of interest and misuse of client funds ==
The principal conflicts of interest investigated by the OSC were:

- Payments from Sean McCoshen related to loans made to McCoshen's company Alaska-Alberta Railway Development Corporation. The OSC alleges that following the funding of loans to various McCoshen companies, McCoshen funnelled a total of $19.5 million to David Sharpe, largely through his personal chequing account. The OSC discovered that Natasha Sharpe received $250,000 from one of McCoshen's companies.
- Use of Bridging client funds to pay for purchase of Ninepoint Partners LP's management interest in Sprott Bridging Income Fund LP. With the cooperation of Rishi Gautam, who was a Bridging borrower at the time, the OSC discovered that the Sharpes and Mushore misappropriated $40 million to pay for the purchase, which ultimately benefited Bridging's shareholders Natasha Sharpe and the Cocos.
- The OSC has discovered that Mr. Sharpe was able to facilitate their misappropriation by a false loan invoice by using the signature of one of their borrowers from a completely different loan document. This made it appear as though the money came from elsewhere. This action by Mr. Sharpe wrongfully implicated Mr. Gautam who was the CEO of MJardin Group Inc. at the time.
- The use of Bridging client funds to enable Gary Ng to purchase 50% of Bridging's shares from Natasha Sharpe and the Cocos. After Ng was the majority shareholder of Bridging, Bridging provided additional loans to various Ng-controlled companies. The OSC also states that Ng paid $500,000 to each of David and Natasha Sharpe in November 2019. According to the OSC, "neither payment served a legitimate commercial purpose".

== OSC Tribunal finds bridging finance executives guilty of fraud ==
On October 29, 2024, Ontario Securities Commission (OSC) Tribunal ruled that Bridging Finance Inc. (BFI) founders David and Natasha Sharpe engaged in fraud, leading to over $1 billion in investor losses.

The tribunal found that the Sharpes conflicted transactions and securities violations, including channeling millions in loans to companies tied to businessman Sean McCoshen, who paid kickbacks to the Sharpes. The tribunal also found that $40 million was used to benefit BFI and the Sharpes in a deal with Ninepoint Partners LP, and loans were also transferred to Gary Ng, who used fake collateral to buy a stake in BFI.

Natasha Sharpe was also implicated in approving $32 million in loans to Gary Ng's companies, with Mr. Ng paying the Sharpes $1 million. David Sharpe received $19.5 million in kickbacks from Sean McCoshen, with $18.2 million traced to investor funds.

The tribunal found the Sharpes guilty of fraud, document forgery, and misleading investigators. It further noted that David Sharpe attempted to intimidate former employees, business associates, and borrowers, while wrongfully implicating others in their fraudulent schemes. BFI’s former compliance officer Andrew Mushore was also found to have indirectly participated in the misconduct.

== Receivership and financial recovery for investors ==
Bridging was placed into receivership by the Ontario Court of Justice on 30 April 2021. PwC terminated David Sharpe and Natasha Sharpe within days of taking over as receiver.

In its role as receiver, PricewaterhouseCoopers (PwC) launched a process to sell Bridging's debt portfolio. The proceeds of the sale would be used to partially repay investors in Bridging's private credit funds. In April 2022, PwC stated that the bids that it received for the portfolio were below the likely value of an orderly liquidation. PwC then recommended to the court that the portfolio be allowed run-off over a five-year period. PwC's estimates of likely recoveries were between 34% and 42%, that would lead to total losses of approximately $1.3 billion out of the peak assets of $2.09 billion.

As the investigations have continued, it has become clear that Rishi Gautam was a victim of the principal of Bridging Finance and their fraudulent activities who was wrongly accused and is no longer being investigated by the OSC. As a result, most of the lawsuits in which he was included as one of the defendants have discontinued and withdrawn the claims against him.

PWC has also disclosed that they, as the receiver, are actively trying to track down "funds transferred by certain former principals of Bridging Finance to, among other jurisdictions, Liechtenstein and the Cayman Islands.”

== Legal Proceedings ==
Bridging had two auditing relationships for its funds over time with KPMG beginning to audit the largest fund (initially named the Sprott Bridging Income Fund) in 2016. Ernst & Young (EY) was auditor of several other Bridging funds over the 2014-2018 period. All auditing was consolidated with KPMG in 2019. In their role as receiver, PWC is suing both of Bridging's former accountants alleging weaknesses in their audit processes that allowed the Sharpes to commit fraud.

In April 2023 PwC launched a series of lawsuits against Bridging's former auditor, KMPG, Bridging insiders and external borrowers implicated in the fraud cases outlined by the OSC: PWC filed suit against KPMG on 12 April 2023 for CAD$1.4 billion. PwC alleges that "throughout KPMG’s tenure, the Bridging funds materially misrepresented the value of their assets and financial performance. KPMG negligently failed to detect and report on these misstatements.”

In June 2025, PWC filed suit against EY for $1.4 billion alleging that EY failed to detect fraud when it audited several Bridging funds.

== Audit investigations ==
In March 2026, the Ontario Securities Commission commenced enforcement proceedings against KPMG LLP in connection with its audits of Bridging Finance funds conducted in 2019 and 2020.

The OSC alleged that KPMG failed to perform adequate audit procedures, particularly with respect to loan valuation, and did not sufficiently challenge management assumptions despite evidence of borrower defaults and potential impairment.

The regulator further alleged that the audit reports gave investors a "false sense of confidence" and contributed to investment decisions made at inflated values.

The proceedings seek penalties of up to $40 million. KPMG has denied the allegations and stated that it intends to defend its audit work.

PwC Receiver Lawsuits re Bridging Finance
| Defendants | Filed | Claimed Damages | Status as of July 2025 |
|---|---|---|---|
| KPMG LLP | 12 April 2023 | C$1.4 billion (auditor negligence) | Ongoing |
| EY (Ernst & Young LLP) | 11 June 2025 | C$1.4 billion (audit failures) | Ongoing (new claim) |
| David & Natasha Sharpe et al. (incl. Jenny & Rock‑Anthony Coco) | 27 April 2023 | C$1.7 billion (fraud, breach of duty) | Ongoing |
| Gary Ng et al. | 8 April 2023 | C$160 million (fraud/unjust enrichment) | Ongoing |
| Rishi Gautam et al. | 28 April 2023 | ~C$38 million (fraud/unjust enrichment) | Withdrawn/Discontinued |
| Sean McCoshen et al. | 28 April 2023 | C$160 million + US$5.8 million (civil fraud) | Ongoing |
| Chubb Insurance Co. of Canada | 26 April 2023 | C$90 million (fidelity insurance) | Ongoing |
