= Chartered Accountants' Hall =

Coordinates: 51.5163°N 0.0884°W

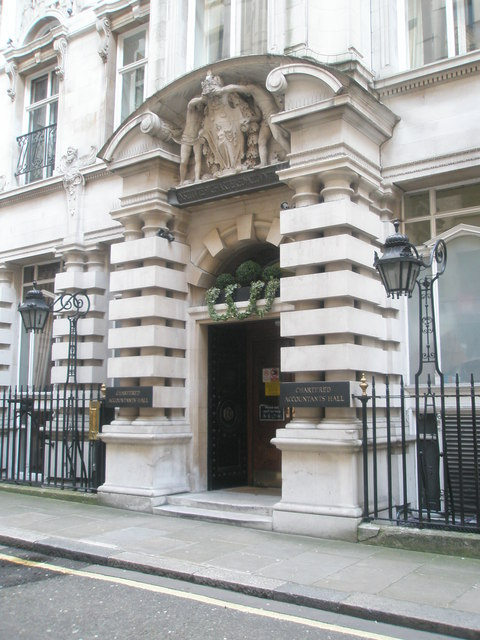
- Entrance to Chartered Accountants Hall in Moorgate Place
- Interactive map of the Chartered Accountants' Hall area

General information
- Type: Office building
- Architectural style: Neo-Baroque, Brutalist
- Location: One Moorgate Place, London, EC2, United Kingdom
- Opened: 10 May 1893
- Owner: Institute of Chartered Accountants in England & Wales

Design and construction
- Architects: Sir John Belcher RA, with extensions by J. J.Joass and Sir William Whitfield
- Designations: Grade II* listed building

Chartered Accountants' Hall is a Grade II* listed building located at 1 Moorgate Place in the City of London. It is the headquarters of the Institute of Chartered Accountants in England & Wales (ICAEW). The Hall is one of the richest examples of late Victorian architecture in the City and has been praised for its seamless integration of sculpture.

It established the fame of its architect, John Belcher. Chartered Accountants' Hall was Belcher's first building in a more monumental Baroque Revival style, drawing on Baroque architecture which he had studied while travelling in Europe.

Some sources attribute the building as a joint design by Belcher in conjunction with Arthur Beresford Pite, who was a partner in Belcher's practice. The two men were friends and admired each other's work. A pupil of Belcher's at the time claimed that Pite's energy and personality had "very strongly" influenced Belcher and had left its impression above all on the Chartered Accountants building. In The Alliance of Sculpture and Architecture (1993), the authors begin a discussion of the influence of Pite upon Belcher's new Baroque style for the Hall by stating:

To what extent the design was the work of Arthur Beresford Pite [...] has never been satisfactorily established.

== Construction ==
Between 1880 and 1890, ICAEW was based in 3 Copthall Buildings while a location was sought for a permanent headquarters. During a special meeting in 1888, William Deloitte put forward a motion to purchase the site at Moorgate Place on a 999 year lease at a ground rent of £900 per annum. The competition for designs was won by John Belcher, with an estimated cost of £17,250. The ICAEW Council also commissioned Hamo Thornycroft to produce a sculpted frieze at an additional cost of £3,000.

Construction was delayed as the original contractors went into receivership, the work being completed by Messrs Coll & Sons. In the event, the terms of the lease were altered to £472 for twenty years increasing to £786 thereafter, in return for part of the site being given up to expand Great Swan Alley.

The foundation stone of Chartered Accountants' Hall was laid in July 1890. Under the stone were placed current issues of The Times and The Accountant, a copy of the Institute's Charter and Bye-Laws, a list of members, and examples of the copper and silver (though not gold) coins of the day.

The Hall was formally opened on 10 May 1893 by the Institute President, Edwin Waterhouse. It originally provided 19,500 square feet of accommodation. The final cost came to £41,561 3s 0d, including heating, lighting, ground rents and the architect's commission.

== Interior ==
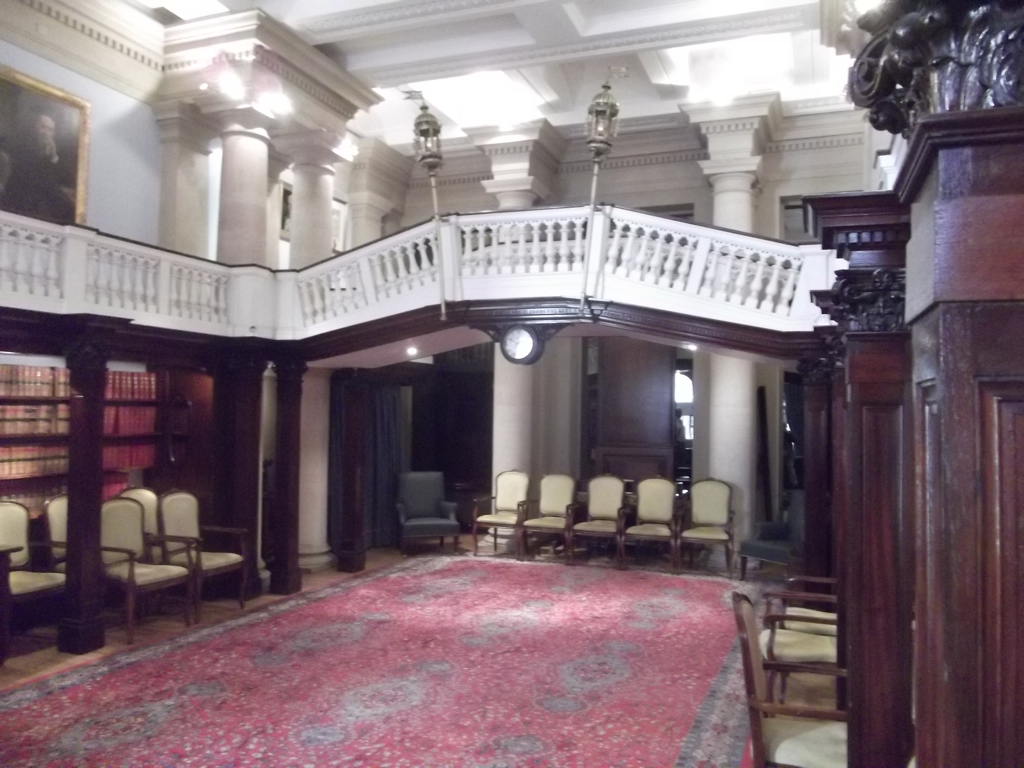
The former library of the hall, now a members' room, includes a balustraded Venetian-style bridge, decorated with lanterns

The building has been described as “one of the few Victorian buildings in the City with interiors worthy of its ornate facades.”

It features a pilastered entrance hall with coffered ceiling after Alessi's Palazzo Cambiaso in Genoa. The substantial former library (now the members' room) has a gallery and balustraded bridge inspired by the Rialto Bridge in Venice. It is believed to be the only example of an indoor bridge in the UK. In August 2022 award-winning British artist Alexander Beleschenko added three new stained glass windows into this room, featuring a contemporary arrangement of over a thousand individual pieces of precision-cut glass - blue, orange, purple, green and yellow squares and triangles arranged against a white grid pattern. LED panels placed behind the glass illuminate it, with the rear surface of the windows being coated with a soft, organic texture to diffuse the lighting.

Beleschenko has written an 'Artist's view' of his creative process for the Architects' Journal, describing the artwork as "a combination of realism and abstraction", inspired by details in the decoration seen elsewhere in the building. For example, the coloured shapes are inspired by stained-glass windows located upstairs, while the grid backdrop references the building’s black and white floor patterns. The windows’ bright hues and decorative shapes collectively help give the room a positive and uplifting feel.

The staircase originally featured stained-glass windows by Henry Holiday, completed in 1898. These were re-installed in 2017, a year ahead of the 125th anniversary of the building's opening, and are now positioned in the entrance to the Great Hall. Holiday's original 1897 watercolour designs for the windows are housed in the Prints, Drawings & Paintings collection of the Victoria and Albert Museum in London.

The council chamber (now the reception room) has a high domed ceiling and elaborate wall-paintings by George Murray to Belcher's designs, representing the Triumph of the Law and Science bringing Order to Commerce.

== Frieze ==
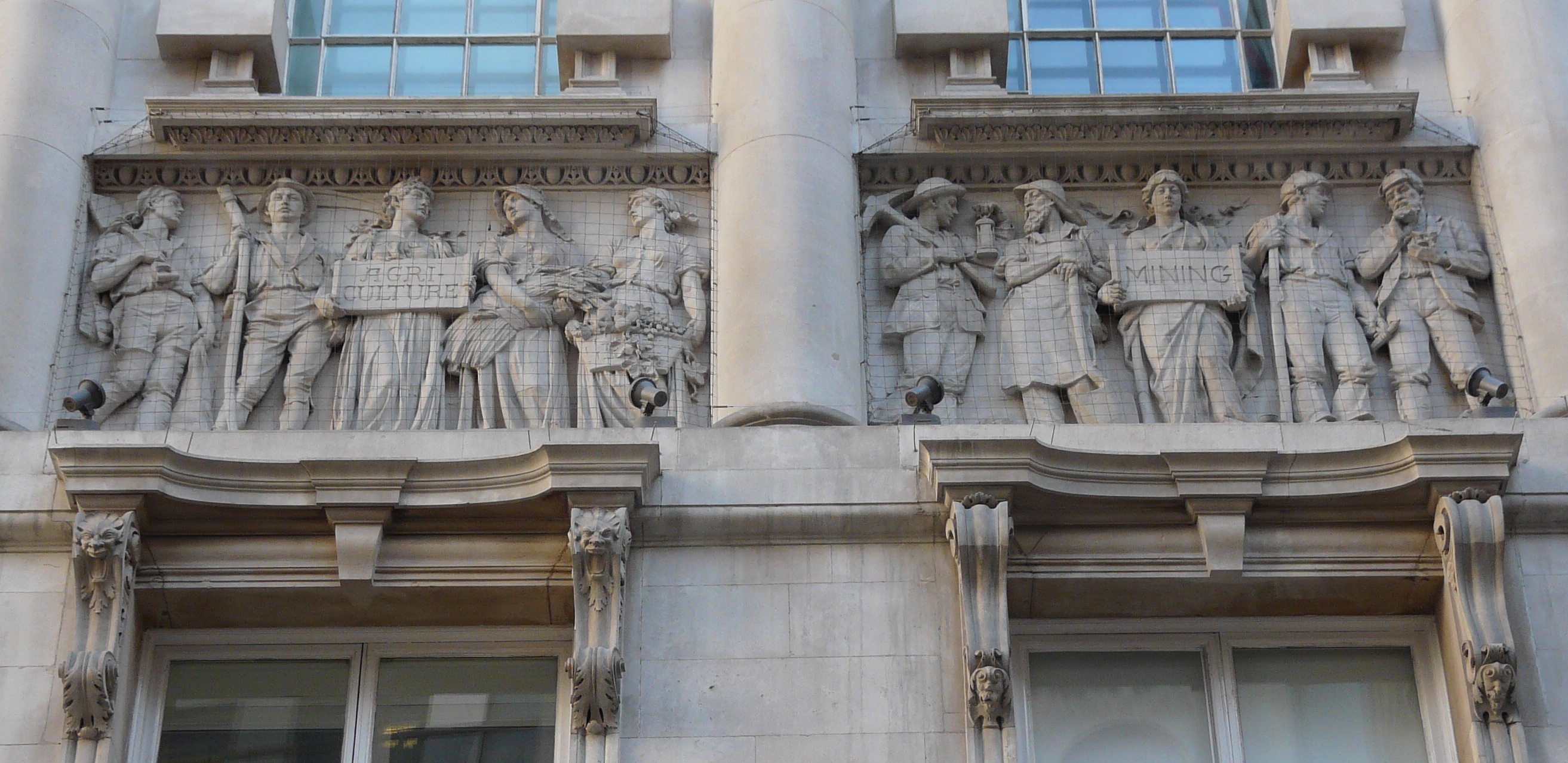
Frieze sections of Agriculture and Mining

Thornycroft's frieze depicts groups of figures representing Arts, Sciences, Crafts, Education, Commerce, Manufacture, Agriculture, Mining, Railways, Shipping, India, the Colonies, and Building. The figure of the architect is based on Belcher and the sculptor on Thornycroft himself. The figure of the solicitor is H. Markby of Markby, Stewart & Co., who acted for ICAEW in its early years.

When the Hall was expanded in 1930 the frieze was continued for another 50 feet by James Alexander Stevenson on the theme of the history of building. This is represented by British, Italian, Gothic, Byzantine, Roman, Greek, Assyrian, Egyptian and Prehistoric figures.

For the Whitfield extension in the 1960s, David McFall completed three final panels. These depict Egyptians and the foundation of accounting, 19th-century men as the founding fathers of ICAEW, and four Renaissance figures including Luca Pacioli, the first person to publish a work on double-entry bookkeeping.

== First extension ==
As ICAEW expanded after the First World War it became necessary to extend the original building. In 1926 the Institute purchased Swan House on the adjoining land. J. J. Joass, a pupil of Belcher's, was commissioned to extend the building eastwards and provide an additional 5,000 square feet for meeting rooms and offices. The final cost of the extension came to £35,976 9s. 6d.

== Second extension ==
In 1957 the Society of Incorporated Accountants was integrated into the national bodies of accountants, boosting the Institute's membership by 10,000. William Whitfield was commissioned in 1959 to report on the feasibility of a new building. It was decided to extend the existing building substantially and create a Great Hall to accommodate functions, large meetings and other events. Final designs were accepted in 1964 and the new headquarters was opened by HM Queen Elizabeth The Queen Mother in May 1970.

Unusually for a space of this size, Whitfield's Great Hall is uninterrupted by any supporting columns. Instead the office floors above are suspended from beams supported by four exterior concrete pillars. The rough plaster relief finish that covers the walls is known as "Elephant Trunking", as it was first used on the Elephant House at London Zoo.

Of the building as a whole, Nikolaus Pevsner noted that: ”here is proof, if proof were needed, that the uncompromisingly new can go with the old, if handled by an appreciative and imaginative architect.” The two extensions - Joass's complementary extension juxtaposed with Whitfield's Brutalist bush-hammered concrete - help contribute to Chartered Accountants' Hall being designated a Grade II* listed building. The extension was awarded a Certificate of Commendation by The Concrete Society in 1971.

The total cost of the new building came to almost £2.5 million and added 63,000 square feet of space. The improvements included a new set of offices for the library and a members' restaurant. It was at this point that the council chamber became the reception room, the old library became the members' room, and the Oak Hall was divided horizontally into a new council chamber and a set of interview rooms.

In 2018, the Great Hall was refurbished with new floors, furniture and wall decoration, and updated conferencing facilities.

== Ornaments and furnishings ==
ICAEW possesses numerous antique furnishings and works of art gifted by individuals or accountancy bodies, including several given to celebrate the centenary in 1980.

The walls of the Hall feature portraits of the ICAEW's first presidents, including William Barclay Peat and William Welch Deloitte. The Hall owns a set of specially produced silverware by Gerald Benney and a set of three paintings commissioned from John Piper.

A set of three tapestries by Sir Eduardo Paolozzi have been moved from the Great Hall to a new location on the Copthall Avenue stairway, leading down from the ground floor to the members' club. The three highly distinctive pieces, which represent present day and future societies in relation to the role played by ICAEW, were commissioned in 1980 as part of the Institute's centenary celebrations. Titled A Perspective on Innovation, the colourful abstract designs feature modern innovations such as a jet engine, a micro chip and a television. In creating the tapestries, Paolozzi described his aim as being to "depict our world of today in a manner using the same bold pictorial style as the Bayeux tapestries in France – to record the images of our time for future years in a proven and permanent material".

The library's rare book collection holds early works on accounting and bookkeeping, including the complete published works of Luca Pacioli, and the only complete copy of the oldest surviving original book on accounting in English (James Peele's The maner and fourme how to kepe a perfecte reconying (1554)).

== Facilities ==
In addition to functioning as ICAEW's administrative headquarters, Chartered Accountants' Hall offers business and social facilities to its members and the general public. These include a café, a members' club, a lending library and a business centre.
