= The Accountant =

The Accountant may refer to:

- The Accountant (magazine), accounting magazine published in the UK
- The Accountant (2001 film), winner of the Academy Award for Live Action Short Film
- The Accountant (2016 film), a thriller film starring Ben Affleck
  - The Accountant 2, a 2025 sequel
- "The Accountant", a 2018 episode of Plebs (TV series)
- The Accountant, a character in the 2011 fantasy movie Drive Angry

== See also ==
- Accountant, a practitioner of accounting
