= Joe Ucuzoglu =

American businessman

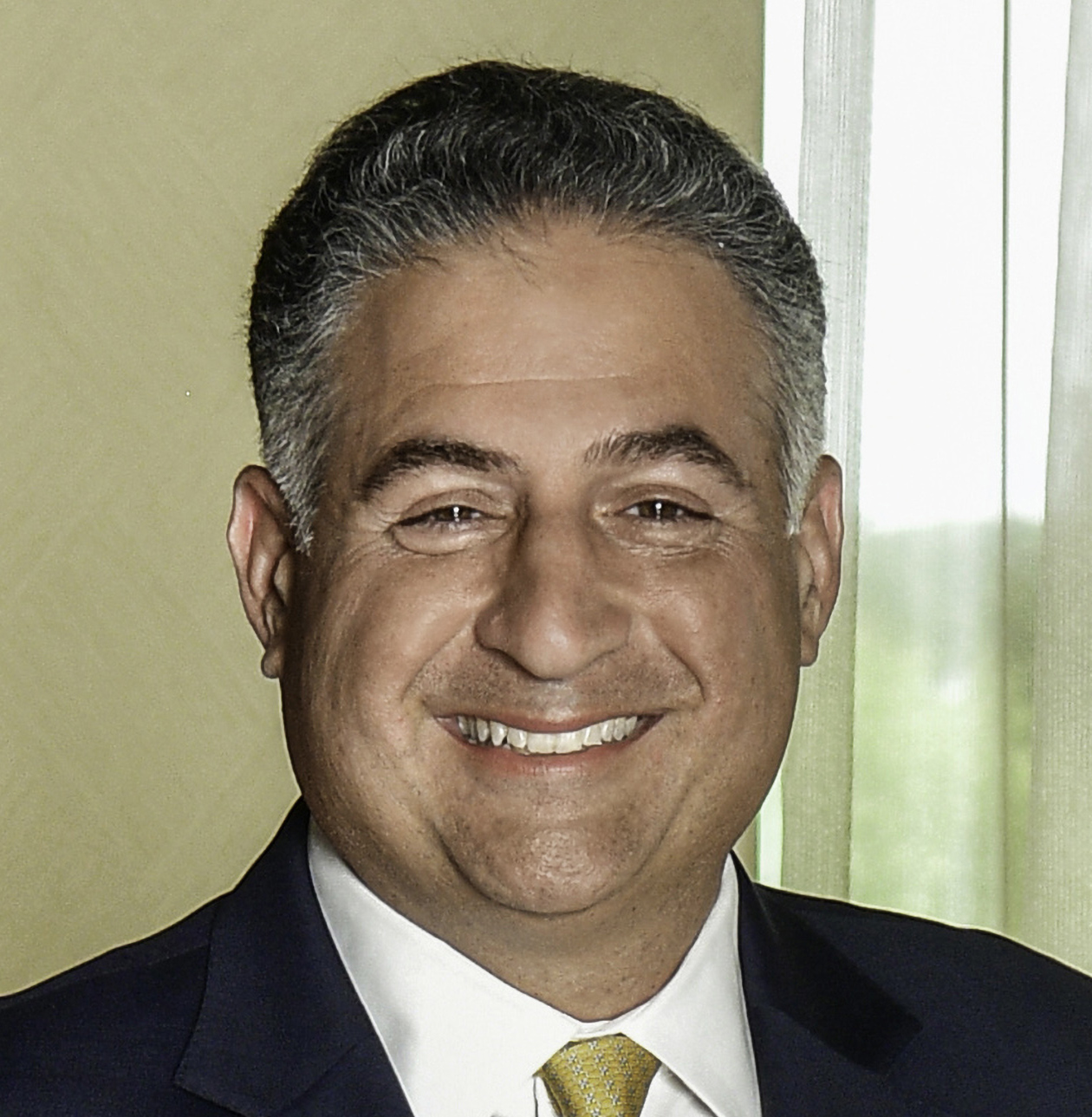
- Ucuzuglu in 2019
- Born: July 11, 1977 (age 49); Los Angeles, California, U.S.
- Education: University of Southern California (BS)
- Employer: Deloitte
- Title: Global CEO

Joe Ucuzoglu (born July 11, 1977) is an American businessman and global CEO of Deloitte.

== Early life and education ==
Ucuzoglu grew up in Los Angeles, California. He graduated from the University of Southern California with a Bachelor of Science degree in accounting.

== Career ==
Ucuzoglu joined Deloitte in 1997. Prior to being appointed the Global CEO of Deloitte, he served as CEO of Deloitte US from 2019 to 2022.

Ucuzoglu is a regular speaker at business schools across the US, including Duke University's Fuqua School of Business, Yale University's School of Management, University of Virginia Darden School of Business, University of Southern California's Marshall School of Business, and University of Notre Dame's Mendoza College of Business.

Ucuzoglu is a frequent speaker at The World Economic Forum Annual Meeting, where he has addressed topics such as workplace health equity. He is a Forbes brand contributor and appears as a regular guest on Fortune's Leadership Next podcast series. During the COVID-19 pandemic, Ucuzoglu was widely cited regarding the future of hybrid work and the Great Resignation.

Ucuzoglu received media attention for a 2023 video statement in which he articulated the substantial benefits of Deloitte's integrated multidisciplinary model for its clients and professionals, coinciding with controversy surrounding competitor EY's plan to separate into two organizations.

Also in 2023, Ucuzoglu addressed the transformative potential of generative AI tools such as ChatGPT, citing their ability to enhance human capability and stating that their use cases would "fundamentally alter the profession."

Under Ucuzoglu's leadership, Deloitte published a report in 2023 outlining the potential of green hydrogen, a renewable energy source, to become a $1.4 trillion global market by 2050. Ucuzoglu stated that the research highlighted a compelling opportunity to accelerate the green energy transition, tackling decarbonization in some of the world's most emissions-intensive and hardest-to-abate sectors.

Ucuzoglu is a member of the Business Roundtable and Chairs the Board of Councilors of the University of Southern California Marshall School of Business. Ucuzoglu has also served on the board of directors of the United States Chamber of Commerce and the executive committee of the Partnership for New York City.

== Personal life ==
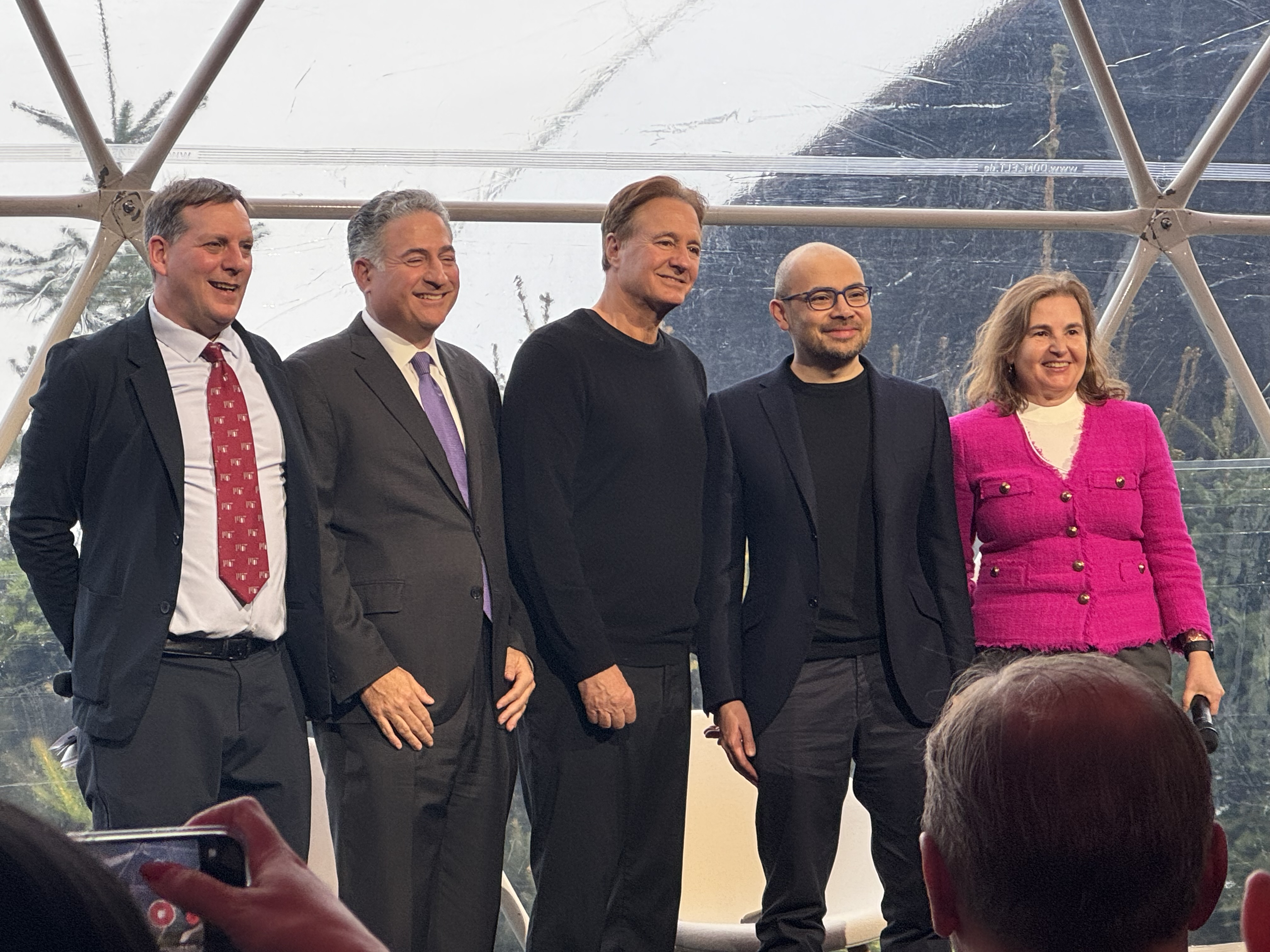
Joe Ucuzoglu (second from left) with John K. Werner, Steve Pagliuca, Demis Hassabis and Daniela Rus at the AI Imagination in Action Summit in Davos, Switzerland

Ucuzoglu is married to Tracy Ucuzoglu.
