= Deloitte =

Multinational professional services network

Deloitte Touche Tohmatsu Limited
- Trade name: Deloitte
- Type: Private company limited by guarantee
- Industry: Professional services
- Founded: 1845; 181 years ago in London, England
- Founder: William Welch Deloitte
- Headquarters: London, England, UK
- Area served: Worldwide
- Key people: Anna Marks (Chairperson Deloitte Global); Joseph B. Ucuzoglu (CEO Deloitte Global)
- Services: Audit; Management consulting; Financial advisory; Risk advisory; Tax; Legal
- Revenue: ▲US$70.5 billion (2025)
- Number of employees: 470,000 (2025)
- Website: deloitte.com

Deloitte is a multinational professional services network based in London, England. It is the largest professional services network in the world by revenue and number of employees, and is one of the Big Four accounting firms, along with EY, KPMG, and PwC. The Deloitte network is composed of member firms of Deloitte Touche Tohmatsu Limited (/dəˈlɔɪt ˈtuːʃ toʊˈmɑːtsuː/ də-LOYT TOOSH TOH-maht-soo), a private company limited by guarantee incorporated in England and Wales.

The firm was founded by the accountant William Welch Deloitte in London, England in 1845 and expanded into the United States in 1890. It merged with Haskins & Sells to form Deloitte Haskins & Sells in 1952 and with Touche Ross in the US to form Deloitte & Touche in 1989. In 1993, the international firm was renamed Deloitte Touché Tohmatsu, later abbreviated to Deloitte. In 2002, Arthur Andersen's practice in the UK as well as several of that firm's practices in Europe and North and South America agreed to merge with Deloitte. Subsequent acquisitions have included Monitor Group, a large strategy consulting business, in 2013.

Deloitte provides audit, consulting, financial advisory, risk, tax, and legal services with approximately 470,000 employees globally, and operates in over 150 countries. In FY 2024, the network earned revenues of US$67.2 billion in aggregate. The firm has sponsored a number of activities and events, including the 2012 Summer Olympics.

The firm suffered a major cyberattack in 2017, causing a breach in client confidentiality and publicizing a significant amount of employee information. Deloitte has also been subject to litigation regarding several of its audits. In 2023, Deloitte was the fourth-largest privately owned organization in the United States, and has been continuously ranked on Fortune magazine's list of the 100 Best Companies to Work For.

== History ==
=== Early history ===
In 1845, William Welch Deloitte opened an office in Basinghall Street in London, England. Deloitte was the first person to be appointed an independent auditor of a public company, namely the Great Western Railway. He went on to open an office in New York in 1880. The firm was based at No. 4 Lothbury in London from 1855 to 1905, when it moved to No. 5 London Wall Buildings. In 1890, Deloitte opened a branch office on Wall Street headed by Edward Adams and P.D. Griffiths as branch managers. This was Deloitte's first overseas venture. Other branches were soon opened in Chicago and Buenos Aires. In 1898 P.D. Griffiths returned from New York and became a partner in the London office. In 1896, Charles Waldo Haskins and Elijah Watt Sells formed Haskins & Sells in New York. It was later described as "the first major auditing firm to be established in the country by American rather than British accountants". In 1898, George Touche established an office in London and then, in 1900, joined John Ballantine Niven in establishing the firm of Touche Niven in the Johnston Building at 30 Broad Street in New York.

On 1 March 1933, Colonel Arthur Hazelton Carter, President of the New York State Society of Certified Public Accountants and managing partner of Haskins & Sells, testified before the U.S. Senate Committee on Banking and Currency. Carter helped convince Congress that independent audits should be mandatory for public companies.

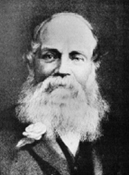
William Welch Deloitte, founder of Deloitte

In 1947, Detroit accountant George Bailey, then president of the American Institute of Certified Public Accountants, launched his own organization. The new entity enjoyed such a positive start that in less than a year, the partners merged with Touche Niven and A. R. Smart to form Touche, Niven, Bailey & Smart. Headed by Bailey, the organization grew rapidly, in part by creating a dedicated management consulting function. It also forged closer links with organizations established by the co-founder of Touche Niven, George Touche: the Canadian organization Ross and the British organization George A. Touche. In 1960, the firm was renamed Touche, Ross, Bailey & Smart, becoming Touche Ross in 1969. In 1968 Nobuzo Tohmatsu formed Tohmatsu Aoki & Co, a firm based in Japan that was to become part of the Touche Ross network in 1975. In 1972 Robert Trueblood, Chairman of Touche Ross, led the committee responsible for recommending the establishment of the Financial Accounting Standards Board.

Meanwhile, the head office of Deloitte's firm moved to No. 128 Queen Victoria Street in London in September 1964. In 1952, Deloitte's firm (by then known as Deloitte, Plender, Griffiths & Co.) merged with Haskins & Sells to form Deloitte Haskins & Sells.

In 1989, Deloitte Haskins & Sells merged with Touche Ross in the US to form Deloitte & Touche. The merged firm was led jointly by J. Michael Cook and Edward A. Kangas. Led by the UK partnership, a smaller number of Deloitte Haskins & Sells member firms rejected the merger with Touche Ross and shortly thereafter merged with Coopers & Lybrand to form Coopers & Lybrand Deloitte (later to merge with Price Waterhouse to become PwC). Some member firms of Touche Ross also rejected the merger with Deloitte Haskins & Sells and merged with other firms. In the UK, Touche Ross merged with Spicer & Oppenheim in 1990.

=== Recent history ===
At the time of the US-led mergers to form Deloitte & Touche, the name of the firm was a problem, because there was no worldwide exclusive access to the names "Deloitte" or "Touche Ross" – key member firms such as Deloitte in the UK and Touche Ross in Australia had not joined the merger. The name DRT International was therefore chosen, referring to Deloitte, Ross and Tohmatsu. In 1993, the international firm was renamed Deloitte Touche Tohmatsu.

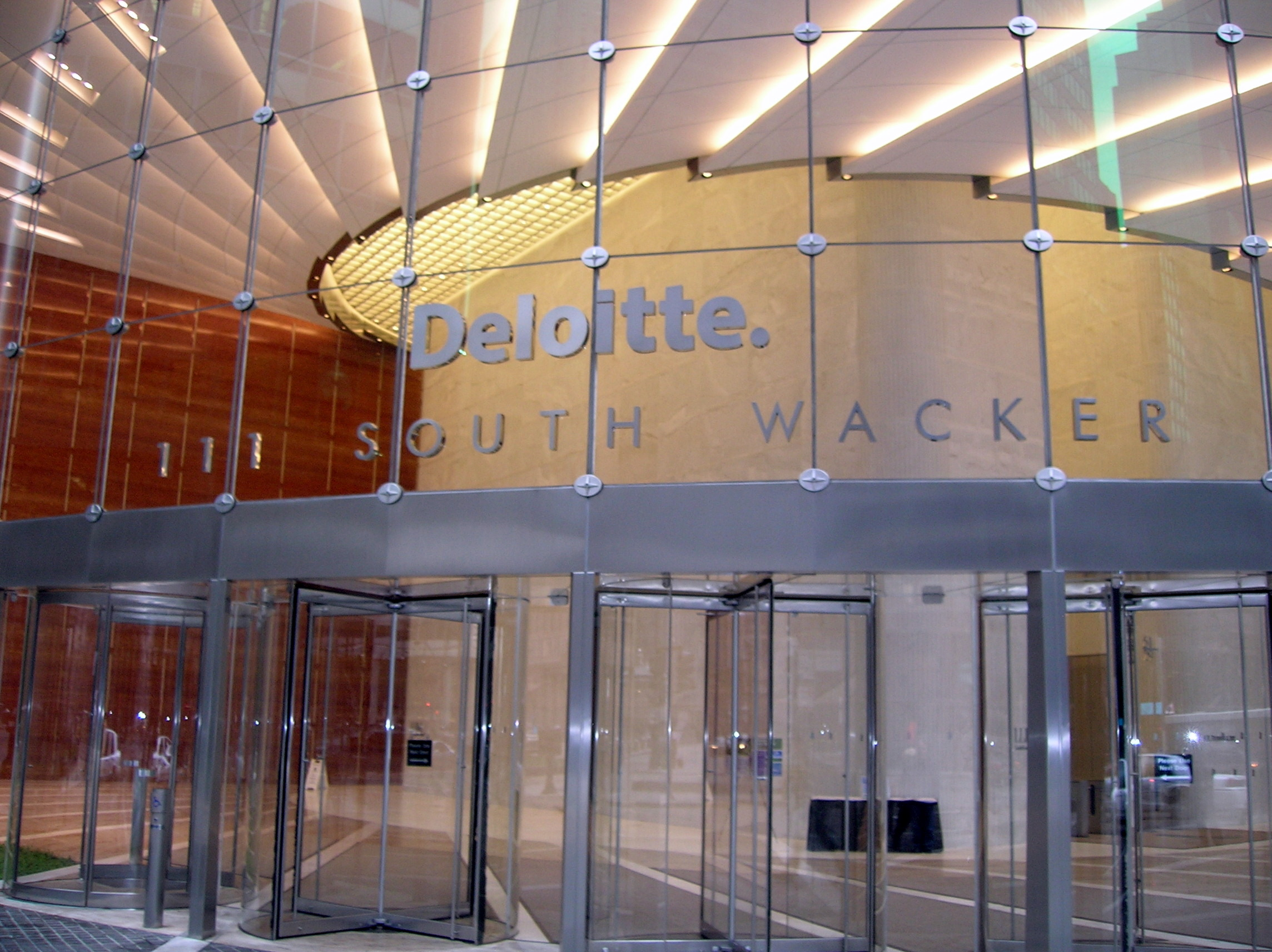
Deloitte office building in downtown Chicago

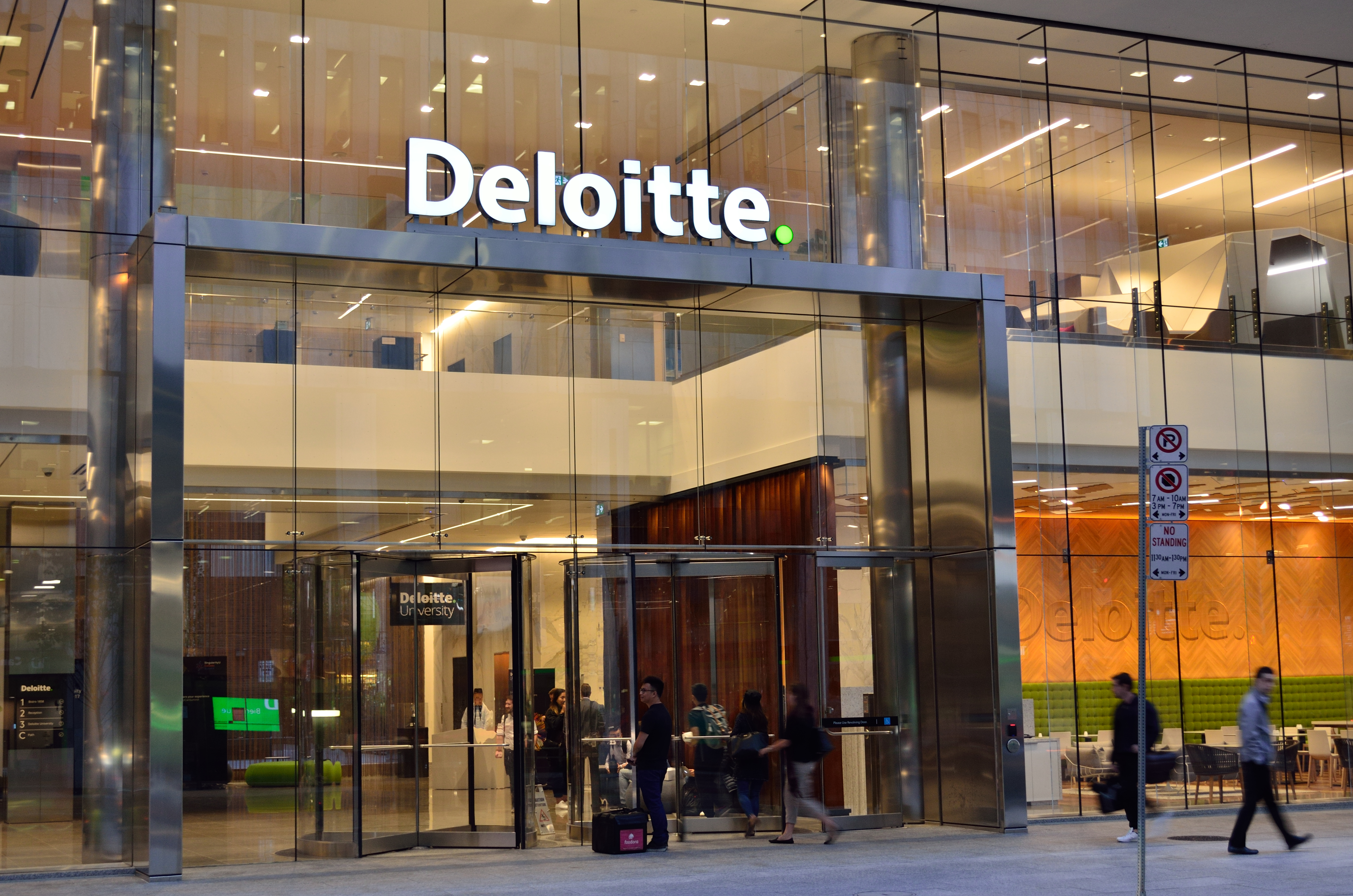
Deloitte office building in Toronto, Canada.

In 1995, the partners of Deloitte & Touche decided to create Deloitte & Touche Consulting Group (now known as Deloitte Consulting).

In 2000, Deloitte acquired Eclipse to add internet design to its consulting capabilities. Eclipse was later separated into Deloitte Online and Deloitte Digital.

In 2002, Arthur Andersen's UK practice, the firm's largest practice outside the US, agreed to merge with Deloitte's UK practice. Andersen's practices in Spain, the Netherlands, Portugal, Belgium, Mexico, Brazil and Canada also agreed to merge with Deloitte. The spinoff of Deloitte France's consulting division led to the creation of Ineum Consulting.

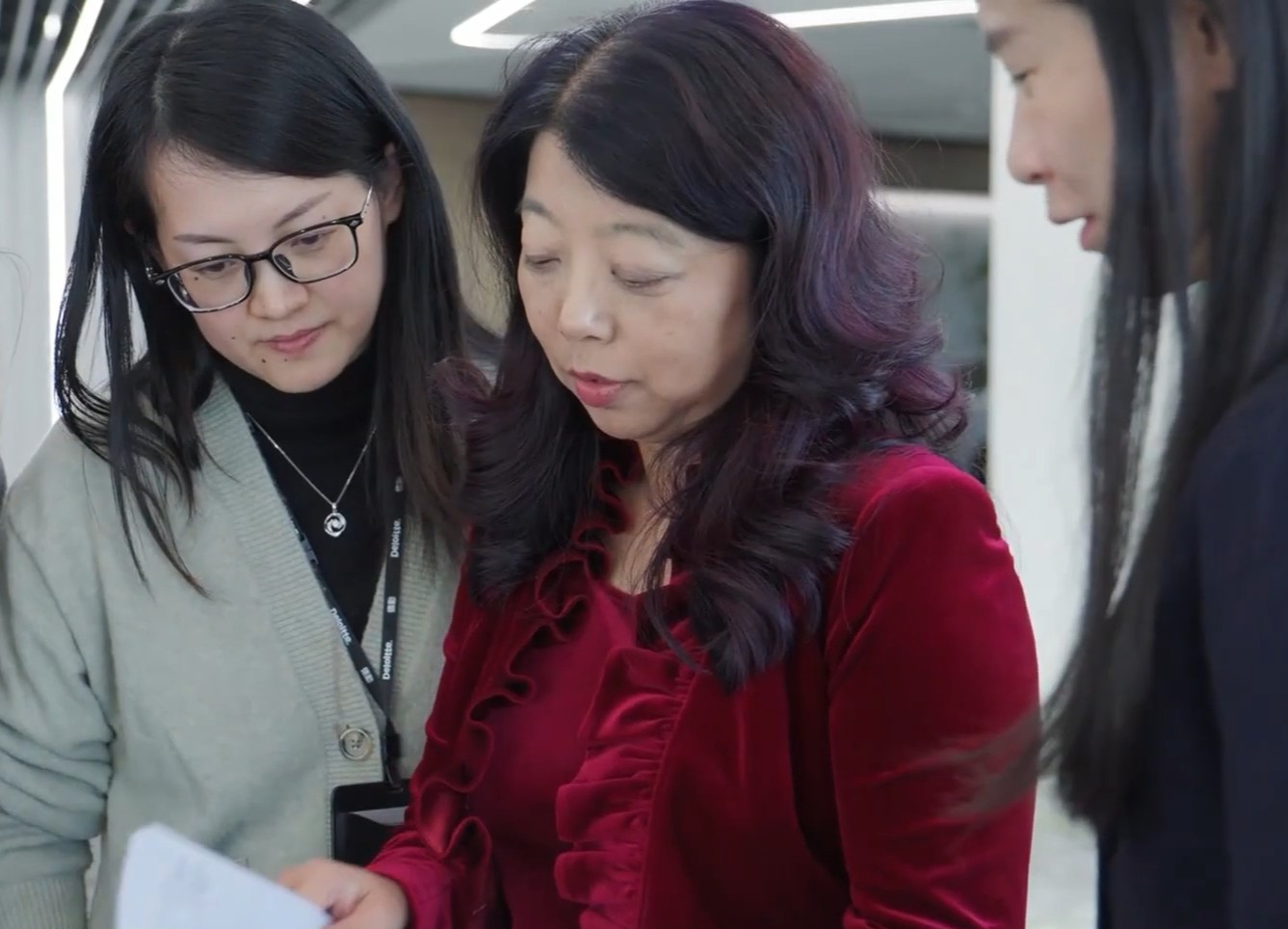
Deloitte China chairwoman Jiang Ying with employees in China on Feb 2026.

In 2005, Deloitte acquired Beijing Pan-China CPA to become the largest accountancy firm in China. Just prior to this acquisition Deloitte China had about 3,200 employees. This acquisition was part of a five-year plan to invest $150 million in China. Deloitte has had a presence in China since 1917. In 2007, Deloitte began hiring former employees of the Central Intelligence Agency (CIA) for their competitive intelligence unit known as Deloitte Intelligence. In 2009, Deloitte purchased the North American public service practice of BearingPoint (formerly KPMG Consulting) for $350 million after it filed for bankruptcy protection. Deloitte LLP took over the UK property consultants Drivers Jonas in January 2010. As of 2013, this business unit was known as Deloitte Real Estate.

In 2011, Deloitte acquired DOMANI Sustainability Consulting and ClearCarbon Consulting in order to expand its sustainability service offerings.

In January 2012, Deloitte announced the acquisition of Übermind, a mobile advertising agency. The acquisition marked Deloitte's first entrance into the mobile application field. In November 2012, Deloitte acquired Recombinant Data Corporation, a company specializing in data warehousing and clinical intelligence software, and launched Recombinant by Deloitte. In February 2013 Recombinant by Deloitte merged with an internal informatics unit (Deloitte Health Informatics) and launched ConvergeHEALTH by Deloitte.

On 11 January 2013, Deloitte purchased substantially all of the business of Monitor Group, the strategy consulting firm founded by Harvard Business School professor Michael Porter, after Monitor filed for bankruptcy protection.

In 2014, the company introduced Rubix, a blockchain consultancy providing advisory services for clients in different business sectors, including government. In 2016 the company created its first blockchain lab in Dublin. A second hub was launched in New York in January 2017. In 2016, Deloitte Canada set up a Bitcoin automatic teller machine and equipped a restaurant in its office complex to accept Bitcoin as payment. Deloitte CIS partnered with Waves Platform to offer services related to initial coin offerings. Deloitte became a member of the Ethereum Enterprise Alliance and the Hyperledger Project sponsored by the Linux Foundation in May 2017.

In 2016, Deloitte acquired the advertising agency Heat of San Francisco, best known for its work for Madden NFL from EA Sports and the Hotwire travel website. Heat was the 11th digital marketing agency purchased by Deloitte Digital since its founding in 2012. As of 2016, Deloitte Digital had 7,000 employees. It billed $2.1 billion in 2015, making it one of world's largest digital agencies.

In September 2016, Apple Inc. announced a partnership with Deloitte aimed at boosting sales of its phones and other mobile devices to businesses. As part of the partnership, the two companies will launch a service called Enterprise Next, in which more than 5,000 Deloitte consultants will advise clients on how to make better use of Apple products and services.

In October 2016, Deloitte announced that they were creating Deloitte North West Europe. The Belgian, Danish, Dutch, Finnish, Icelandic, Norwegian, and Swedish member firms will combine with the UK and Swiss member firms to create Deloitte North West Europe. Deloitte, over the next three years, would invest €200m to enhance its services to its global, national and private market clients and to create development opportunities. The firm came into effect on 1 June 2017 and it is estimated to have 28,000 partners and people generating over €5bn in annual revenue. Deloitte North West Europe accounts for approximately 20% of all revenue within their Global Network.

In March 2022, Deloitte announced that, as a result of the Russo-Ukrainian War, the firm would no longer carry out business in Russia or Belarus, and would separate its practices within these countries from its global network of firms. In March 2022, Deloitte acquired Etain, a data and digital transformation specialist company, based in Northern Ireland.

The Wall Street Journal reported in June 2022 that the firm might choose to divide itself into two new companies, one accounting firm and one advisory firm. The Wall Street Journal reported this potential change several weeks after reporting that Ernst & Young was considering a similar split.

In November 2023, Deloitte entered into a supply contract with Henchmann, a provider of contract drafting and negotiation software that scans and extracts key data points from legal documents. In 2024, Deloitte, Nvidia, Microsoft and Amazon Web Services provided a combined $40 million in funding to multiple cancer institutes to support the establishment of the Cancer AI Alliance. In May 2025, the company informed its UK consulting division it planned to reduce pay rises and cut bonuses by 20 per cent following poor financial performance. In March 2025, Deloitte announced the appointment of Darren Graves as its UK chief executive, replacing Richard Houston. In June 2026, Deloitte Israel acquired Vision.bi, a data and analytics company, to expand its AI and data capabilities.

== Name and branding ==
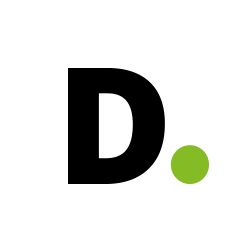
Deloitte logo (short form)

In 1989, Deloitte, Haskins & Sells merged in most countries with Touche Ross, forming Deloitte & Touche. However, in the United Kingdom, the local firm of Deloitte, Haskins & Sells merged instead with Coopers & Lybrand (now part of PwC). While the full name of the UK private company is Deloitte Touche Tohmatsu Limited, in 1989, it initially branded itself as DTT International. In 2003, the rebranding campaign was commissioned by William G. Parrett, the then-CEO of DTT, and led by Jerry Leamon, the global Clients and Markets leader.

According to the company website, Deloitte now refers to the brand under which independent firms throughout the world collaborate to provide audit, consulting, financial advisory, risk management, and tax services to selected clients.

In 2008, Deloitte adopted its new "Always One Step Ahead" (AOSA) brand positioning platform to support the existing Deloitte vision: "To be the Standard of Excellence". AOSA represents the global organization's value proposition and is never used as a tagline. The recent launch of the Green Dot ad campaign also aligns with Deloitte's brand strategy and positioning framework.

In June 2016, Deloitte changed its branding and adopted a new logo, with Deloitte written in the color black instead of the earlier blue. In India, Deloitte operates under several brand names, including A.F.Ferguson &Co., A.F.Ferguson Associates, S.B.Billimoria, C.C.Choksi & Co., P.C.Hansotia, Fraser & Ross and Deloitte Haskins & Sells (India).

== Legal structure ==
For many years, the organization and its network of member firms were legally organized as a Swiss Verein (the equivalent of an unincorporated association). As of 31 July 2010, members of the Verein became part of Deloitte Touche Tohmatsu Limited (DTTL), a UK private company limited by guarantee without share capital. Each member firm in its global network remains a separate and independent legal entity, subject to the laws and professional regulations of the particular country or countries in which it operates. DTTL itself has been a dormant company since its incorporation in 2010.

This structure is similar to other professional services networks which seek to limit vicarious liability for acts of other members. As separate and legal entities, DTTL and its member firms cannot obligate each other. Professional services continue to be provided by member firms only and not DTTL. With this structure, the members should not be liable for the negligence of other independent members. This structure also allows them to be members of the IFAC Forum of Firms.

In 2019, the U.K. partners in the firm received average pay of £882,000. In 2023, the average income of Deloitte partners in the U.K. topped £1,000,000 for the third year in a row.

== Deloitte University ==
In October 2011, Deloitte invested $300 million to establish the Deloitte University campus in Westlake, Texas, which was the largest investment for employee development in the company's history. In 2022, the firm announced an additional $100 million expansion plan for the Texas site.

== Services ==
Deloitte member firms offer services in the following functions, with country-specific variations on their legal implementation (i.e., all operating within a single company or through separate legal entities operating as subsidiaries of an umbrella legal entity for the country).

=== Audit ===
Audit provides the organization's traditional accounting and audit services, as well as internal auditing, IT control assurance and Media & Advertising Assurance.

Investors in Guangdong Kelon Electrical Holdings Company Limited have claimed that there was a failure to alert them to the company's poor financial position. Deloitte claims it did a good job on the project. Deloitte's global CEO defended the firm's work on the Kelon matter. The firm was the auditor for thirty months from 2002 to 2004. It qualified its opinion in 2004 as to company sales, returns, and allowances. The firm resigned from the Kelon account after completing the 2004 audit. Deloitte said it resigned from the account because management at the client was not committed to best practices in finance.

=== Consulting ===
Consulting assists clients by providing services in the offering areas of strategy, analytics and M&A, customer and marketing, core business operations, human capital, and enterprise technology and performance. Consulting is Deloitte's largest business, bringing over 40% of total revenues in 2021.

In An American Sickness (2017), Dr. Elisabeth Rosenthal attributed to Deloitte a key role in counseling the adoption of "strategic billing" as a way of increasing revenues from hospital business. She dates this development from 2005, when Deloitte hired Tommy Thompson, former secretary of health and human services, as chairman of its global healthcare practice. In 2011, Deloitte was ranked No. 1 by revenue in all areas of healthcare consulting—life sciences, payer, provider, and government health.

The firm implemented the SAP HR system for the Los Angeles Unified School District (LAUSD) for $95 million and because of faults in the system, some teachers were underpaid, overpaid, or not paid at all. As of 31 December 2007, LAUSD had incurred a total of $140 million in payments to Deloitte to get the system working properly. In 2008, there was some evidence that the payroll issues had started to stabilize with errors below 1% according to LAUSD's chief operating officer.

The firm worked on a statewide case management system for the California Judicial Council which originally had a budget of around $260 million. Almost $500 million had been spent and costs were at one time projected to potentially run as high as $2 billion. No single court's system ever became fully operational. California's Judicial Council terminated the project in 2012 citing actual deployment costs associated with the project and California's budget concerns.

=== Financial advisory ===
Financial advisory provides corporate finance services to clients, including dispute, personal and commercial bankruptcy, forensics, e-discovery, document review, advisory, mergers & acquisitions, capital projects consulting and valuation services.

=== Tax and legal ===
Tax and legal helps clients increase their net asset value, undertake the transfer pricing and international tax activities of multinational companies, minimize their tax liabilities, and implement tax computer systems. It also provides advice on the tax implications of various business decisions.

In November 2013, the international development charity ActionAid accused Deloitte of advising large businesses on how they could use Mauritius to avoid potentially hundreds of millions of dollars of tax in some of the poorest countries in Africa. Deloitte responded by saying that, in the absence of double-taxation treaties, they advise their clients to avail themselves of arrangements that could result in less taxes being paid to the countries in question. Deloitte also said it was wrong to say it is tax avoidance to make use of provisions in double tax treaties and that without such treaties investment might be reduced.

=== GovLab ===
GovLab is the internal think tank of Deloitte Consulting LLP's US federal government consulting practice, focused on innovation and government reform. Created in 2010, GovLab is based at New York University in New York, New York, and typically undertakes eight or nine research topics per year, focusing on how future trends, technologies, and business models will affect government.

== Offices ==
Deloitte operates across the world in more than 700 locations and over 150 countries, with nearly 470,000 employees as of 2025.

=== Operations in India ===
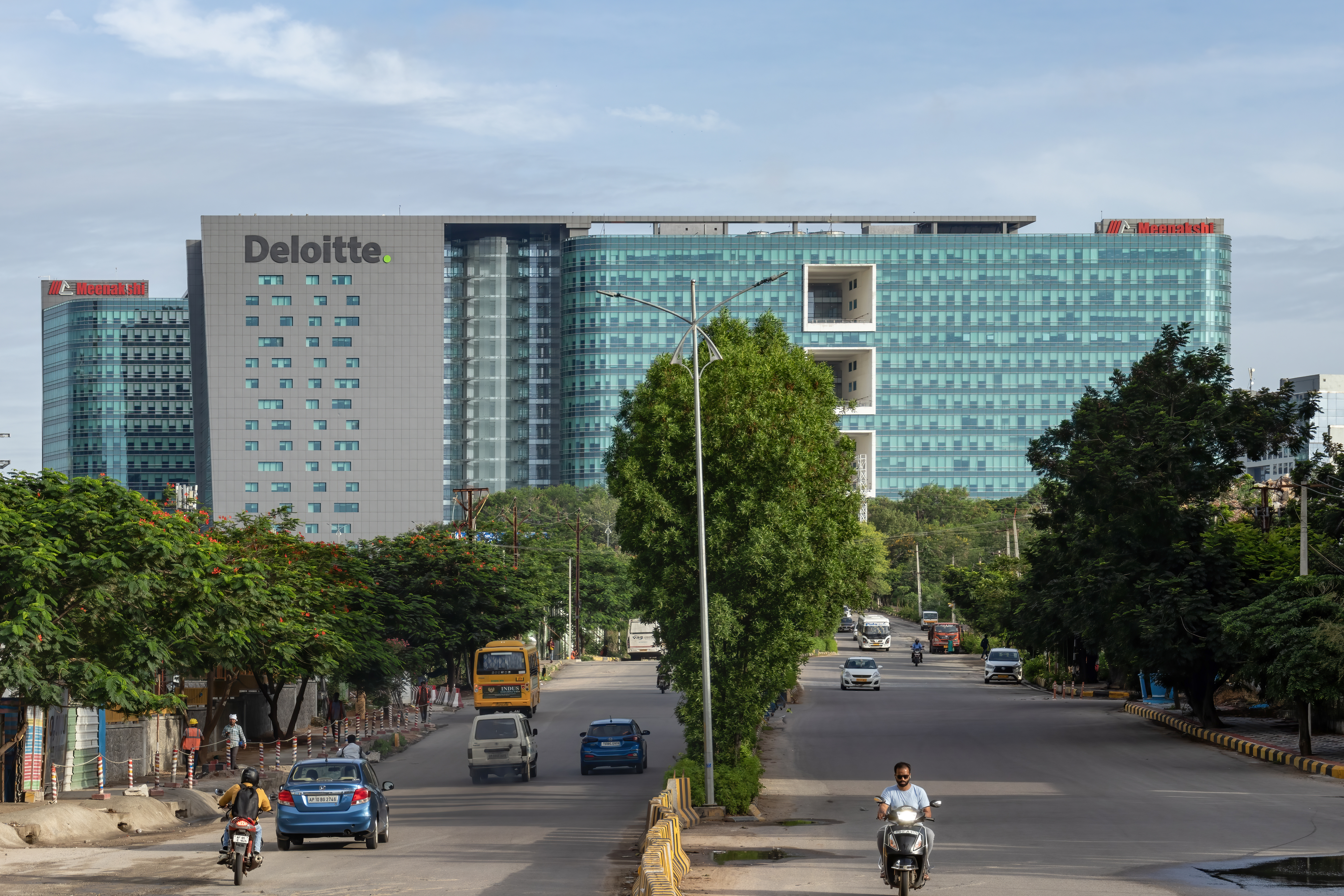
Deloitte Towers, the USI Offices HQ in Hyderabad, India.

In India, Deloitte operates primarily through two distinct entities - Deloitte India (DI), which operates under Deloitte South Asia (Note: Deloitte South Asia is an umbrella term for 5 countries - India, Bangaladesh, Srilanka, Maldives and Mauritius. The central headquarters of Deloitte South Asia is in India.), and Deloitte USI (US India) (Offices of the US) (Note: Deloitte US-India Offices (USI) is the offshore arm of Deloitte US, operating as a distinct legal and operational entity within India. While it is physically located in India, its primary "client" is the US member firm, and its employees support US-based projects across consulting, tax, audit, and advisory services.), which is a region within the Deloitte US organization. Deloitte India caters to clients within India, while Deloitte USI is an entity of Deloitte US that is geographically located in India and caters to clients of the US member firm.

In the late 1990s, Deloitte commenced operations in India, at the same time as another large auditing firm KPMG. In India, ICAI regulations do not permit foreign firms to carry out audits in India. Hence Deloitte carries out audits in India under the name of C.C.Chokshi & Co., an existing auditing firm that it arranged an agreement with in 1998. In 1992, after India was forced to liberalise under one of the conditions of the World Bank and IMF sponsored bail out, Deloitte was granted a license to operate in India. In 2004, A. F. Ferguson & Co., which has been in India for 110 years, joined Deloitte, following CC Chokshi & Company, Fraser & Ross, PC Hansotia & Company and SB Billimoria & Company.

== Awards and recognition ==
Deloitte, along with KPMG, PwC and PA Consulting Group were recognized among the UK's best companies to work for in 2017. That same year, Deloitte was ranked as one of the 10 best places to work for paternity leave by Fatherly, an online resource for parenting news.

Deloitte was named the #1 accounting firm for the 10th year in a row by Inside Public Accounting in August 2018. Deloitte's tax services have been globally recognized by ITR, with the firm winning three consecutive best transfer pricing awards in the Americas. Also in 2018, the research firm Gartner stated that Deloitte has consistently ranked number one globally in "Security Consulting Services" based on revenue.

In 2019, Fortune magazine ranked Deloitte as one of the 100 Best Companies to Work For and Bloomberg Business has named Deloitte as the best place to launch a career.

In 2019, 2020, and 2021, Gartner stated that Deloitte was the No. 1 consulting service provider worldwide by revenue.

== Litigation and regulatory action – auditing ==
=== 1MDB scandal ===
During 2021, Deloitte's Malaysia affiliate agreed to pay the Malaysia government $80 million to resolve all claims related to its auditing of accounts of scandal-linked state fund 1MDB and its unit SRC International from 2011 to 2014. Malaysian and U.S. authorities say at least $4.5 billion was stolen from 1MDB between 2009 and 2014 by high-level officials of the fund and their associates.

=== Adelphia Communications ===
The Securities and Exchange Commission announced on 26 April 2005 that Deloitte had agreed to pay $50 million to settle charges relating to Adelphia's 2000 financial statements. The settlement was later reported to be as high as $210m or $167.5m.

=== Autonomy ===
Following Autonomy's 2011 sale to Hewlett-Packard, the British software company was accused of accounting improprieties that contributed to an $8.8 billion write-down of Autonomy's value. In May 2018, the UK-Based Financial Reporting Council (FRC) launched disciplinary action against Deloitte, Autonomy's auditor at the time of the sale. Deloitte partners who led the audit were accused of failing to correct false and misleading information filed with the FRRP, and otherwise failing to act with objectivity during the course of the audit. The FRC's action followed legal proceedings in the US that found former Autonomy executive Sushovan Hussain guilty of fraud earlier that month.

During 2020, Deloitte was fined a record £15 million and two of its former partners involved in the audits, Richard Knights and Nigel Mercer, were also fined and sanctioned by the UK accounting watchdog, the FRC.

=== Banro Corporation audit independence fine ===
The Public Company Accounting Oversight Board fined Deloitte Canada $350,000 for failing to maintain its independence during three consecutive audits of a Canadian gold-mining company, Banro Corporation.

=== Bondfield Construction ===
CPA Ontario has brought disciplinary charges against two Deloitte partners, Felice "Phil" Iorio and Steve Kostich, for professional misconduct related to their work on audits for failed Bondfield Construction. Bondfield filed for creditor protection in April 2019 and former executives are being sued to recover funds siphoned from the company through a fraudulent invoicing scheme.

=== Carillion ===
Deloitte had acted as internal auditor at construction and services giant Carillion before it went into liquidation in January 2018. The "excoriating" and "damning" (The Guardian) final report of the Parliamentary inquiry into Carillion's collapse was published on 16 May 2018, and criticised Deloitte for its involvement in the company's financial reporting practices.

Go-Ahead Group

In October 2026, the UK's Financial Reporting Council (FRC) fined Deloitte LLP £6.05 million and issued a severe reprimand over its statutory audits of Go-Ahead Group for the financial years 2016 to 2020. The regulator found that Deloitte had failed to sufficiently scrutinise decisions concerning the retention of more than £30 million in public funds by Go-Ahead subsidiaries and had not adequately assessed certain audit risks. The fine was reduced from £11 million in recognition of Deloitte's cooperation and admissions.

=== China Huarong Asset Management Co. ===
In March 2023, China's Ministry of Finance fined Deloitte 211.9 million yuan ($30.8 million) for illegal auditing deficiencies in the audit of China Huarong Asset Management Co. The Ministry found that Deloitte had failed to maintain professional skepticism during the audit. Huarong was fined 800,000 yuan ($116,227) for its role in the auditing deficiencies.

=== Johnston Press audit ===
During 2020, the UK accounting regulator, the Financial Reporting Council, fined Deloitte's UK affiliate £362,500 and reprimanded both the firm and an unnamed audit partner over failures in its audit work for Johnston Press.

=== Livent ===
In proceedings arising from the insolvency of the former entertainment company Livent, in April 2014 its special receiver obtained judgment against Deloitte for $84,750,000 in the Ontario Superior Court of Justice, in relation to Deloitte's failure to exercise its duty of care with respect to the audit of Livent's financial statements during 1993–1998. The ruling was upheld by the Ontario Court of Appeal in January 2016, but in December 2017, the Supreme Court of Canada in Deloitte & Touche v Livent Inc (Receiver of) allowed an appeal in part, declaring that liability existed only in respect of Deloitte's negligence in conducting the audit for Livent's 1997 fiscal year, and accordingly reduced the amount of damages awarded to $40,425,000.

=== Mitie plc ===
In April 2022, Deloitte's UK affiliate was fined £2 million by the UK accounting regulator, Financial Reporting Council, over its 2016 audit of British outsourcing firm, Mitie plc.

=== Philip Services Corp ===
Philip Services Corp was a Canadian metals recycling company that collapsed following the revelation of accounting issues and internal fraud. A class action launched on behalf of US investors against Philip's Canadian auditor Deloitte & Touche LLP was settled in 2007 with Deloitte agreeing to pay US$50.5 million.

=== Serco Geografix Ltd. ===
On 4 July 2019, the Financial Reporting Council fined Deloitte for its failure to properly audit the accounts of a Serco Group subsidiary, Serco Geografix, in 2011 and 2012. The United Kingdom's watchdog fined Deloitte £4.2 million and an additional £300,000 towards the costs of the investigation.

Deloitte's audit engagement partner Helen George was also fined £97,500. FRC stated that the two parties have been sanctioned for their failure to act in accordance with the fundamental principle of professional competence and due care.

=== SIG plc ===
In December 2022, Deloitte's UK affiliate was fined £0.9 million (approximately US$1.1 million) by the Financial Reporting Council. The fine came as a result of the company failing to obtain and supply enough audit evidence testing, rebate terms and debtor balances in connection with the 2015/16 audit of the British subsidiary of Swiss building materials firm SIG plc.

=== Standard Chartered ===
In August 2012, Deloitte Financial Advisory Services (DFAS) publicly denied that as the official internal auditors for Standard Chartered, it helped the bank cover up money laundering operations related to Iran which were earning the bank significant profits by "intentionally omitting critical information". DFAS paid the state of New York a $10 million settlement, was required not to take on new business for one year from designated New York banks, and was required to implement reforms in order to prevent similar problems in the future. The state regulator stated that there was no evidence DFAS intentionally helped Standard Chartered launder money.

=== Steinhoff International ===
In June 2018, Dutch investors' organisation VEB instituted class action legal proceedings against Deloitte's Dutch affiliate on behalf of shareholders who suffered losses as a result of the fraud committed by Steinhoff International. VEB claimed that Deloitte was liable for deficiencies in the audit of Steinhoff.

In October 2020, VEB withdrew its case after the Dutch and South African Deloitte firms agreed to contribute a combined €70 million towards a combined settlement offered by Steinhoff to settle all claims against Steinhoff as a result of the fraud. In a statement published by VEB, it was stated that the settlement by Deloitte did not imply an admission of guilt.

=== Tingo ===
A Deloitte network firm named Brightman Almagor Zohar & Co., sometimes known as Deloitte Israel, gave an unqualified audit opinion on the accounts of Tingo Group, Inc for 2022. This became controversial when a report by Hindenburg Research identified "obvious errors" in Tingo's financials, making Hindenburg "suspect Deloitte Israel missed or rushed through procedures that would have uncovered important findings", and the U.S. Securities and Exchange Commission accused Tingo Group and others of a fraud of "staggering" scope.

=== Tongaat Hulett ===
In January 2022, South African sugar producer Tongaat Hulett announced that it would be suing Deloitte for failing to detect irregularities in its financial statements from 2011 to 2018 that led to the equity of the company being overstated by R12 billion.

In February 2023, Tongaat and Deloitte reached a settlement, in which Deloitte would pay Tongaat R260 million for six years of audited financial statements without admitting liability.

=== Roman Abramovich ===
The Deloitte office in Cyprus helped Russian oligarch Roman Abramovich skirt tax and disclosure laws by transferring assets to the British Virgin Islands with backdated paperwork.

== Litigation and regulatory action – consulting and oversight ==
=== Bandar Malaysia Sdn Bhd ===
During 2019, the Malaysian regulator Securities Commission Malaysia (SC) reprimanded and imposed penalties of RM2.2 million (~$0.5 million) on Deloitte's Malaysian affiliate relating to the Islamic Finance RM2.4 billion ($0.6 billion) (Sukuk Murabahah Programme).

=== Canadian Bar Association ===
In September 2003, Deloitte reported to the Canadian Bar Association (CBA) that motor vehicle accident insurance claims for bodily injury had been declining since 1999 adjusted for inflation. This contradicted the government's and industry's argument that general damages for soft-tissue injury had to be capped at $4,000. Within hours of release, a member of Deloitte was communicating with the Insurance Bureau of Canada without the knowledge of CBA (their client) and providing confidential information. The Institute of Chartered Accountants of Alberta found Deloitte guilty of unprofessional conduct and fined the firm $40,000.

=== Eskom ===
In October 2019, South African power utility Eskom announced that it was suing Deloitte's South African affiliate, Deloitte Consulting, in order to recover R207 million paid for two consulting contracts that were improperly-awarded in 2016. According to the court affidavit filed in the Johannesburg High Court by Eskom chairperson Jabu Mabuza, in one of the contracts awarded to Deloitte, Deloitte bid R88.8-million while the bids from other consulting firms were R14.6-million and R13.3-million. In the second contract, Deloitte bid R79.1-million, and the competing bids were R16-million and R9.1-million.

In an interview with AmaBhungane, Deloitte Consulting's managing director for Africa, Thiru Pillay, said that Eskom was trying to bully Deloitte into a settlement, He further stated that Deloitte had not conceded to being "complicit with irregular procurement" and denied "any undertone of corruption" with regards to the Eskom contracts.

On 21 March 2020, Eskom announced that Deloitte and Eskom had reached an out of court settlement in which Deloitte agreed to pay back R150 million of the R207 million originally sought by Eskom. In a joint statement released by Eskom and Deloitte, the parties agreed that there was no evidence of corruption in the deal, and that there were "technical irregularities" in the procurement process.

In April 2020, Deloitte told AmaBhungane that two directors, Pillay, and the lead consultant on the Eskom contracts, Shamal Sivasanker, had resigned from the firm effective 31 March 2020.

In November 2021, Eskom announced that Deloitte had been selected as Eskom's new external auditor, after the expiration of its contract with Grant Thornton.

=== Netherlands regulator fine ===
During 2016, the Netherlands Authority for the Financial Markets (AFM) imposed an administrative fine of €1.81 million (~$2 million) on Deloitte's Dutch affiliate, Deloitte Accountants B.V. because it failed to comply with its duty of care in inspection audits.

=== Quality control failures in Canada ===
During 2021, the US Public Company Accounting Oversight Board (PCAOB) fined Deloitte's Canadian affiliate $350,000 as a civil penalty for failure to institute reasonable assurance quality controls.

=== Rhode Island Benefits system ===
During 2020, Deloitte's US consulting arm agreed to pay the State of Rhode Island and the US federal government $50 million as a settlement relating to its design of a troubled computer system for its state benefits programs.

=== US companies in China ===
The Securities and Exchange Commission announced on 29 September 2022 that Shanghai-based Deloitte Touche Tohmatsu Certified Public Accountants LLP (Deloitte-China) had agreed to pay $20 million to settle charges relating to failures in complying with requirements for auditing US companies in China and Chinese companies in the US. Deloitte-China, also known as Deloitte Hua Yong, self-reported the deficiencies found in 12 fiscal year 2018 audits. Auditors asked clients to prepare their own paperwork to show that Deloitte-China had completed audits in at least 21 instances, creating the illusion that it followed relevant requirements when there was no evidence of it doing so. For nine clients with operations in China, Deloitte's US office also outsourced its audit work to Deloitte China.

=== US unemployment portals ===
Deloitte Consulting has been heavily involved in building unemployment insurance web portals across various US states, including Ohio, Colorado and Illinois. In May 2020, it was revealed that major security weaknesses existed in the web portals of these states. Proposed class actions were filed against the company. This follows similar short-fallings in Florida's unemployment portal. The CONNECT site, designed by Deloitte, was described as a "colossal failure" as it was created over-budget, delivered late, and did not work. In May 2020, an investigation was ordered by Florida Governor Ron DeSantis, finding that Deloitte ran insufficient stress testing.

== Computer hack ==
In September 2017, The Guardian reported that Deloitte suffered a cyberattack that breached the confidentiality of its clients and 244,000 staff, allowing the attackers to access "usernames, passwords, IP addresses, architectural diagrams for businesses and health information". Reportedly, Deloitte had stored the affected data in Microsoft's Azure cloud hosting service, without two-step verification. The attackers were thought to possibly have had access from as early as October 2016. Brian Krebs reported that the breach affected all of Deloitte's email and administrative user accounts. A later report by The Wall Street Journal repeated Deloitte's statement that only a few clients were affected. Deloitte reportedly first noticed suspicious activity in April 2017. Deloitte said that its businesses were not disrupted and no sensitive information was compromised, and that its investigators were eventually able to read every email obtained by the hackers.

In October 2017, The Guardian reported that client accounts compromised in the breach included, but were not limited to, the US Department of Defense, the US Department of Homeland Security, the US State Department, the US Department of Energy, mortgage companies Fannie Mae and Freddie Mac, the National Institutes of Health (NIH), and the US Postal Service. Fannie Mae and Freddie Mac issued statements saying they were not affected by the attack and denied that any of their data was compromised.

Deloitte said that it immediately contacted legal authorities and six clients. Deloitte also increased security measures on the advice of both internal and external experts. As of October 2017, the New York attorney general's office was investigating the hack.

== Trump administration ==
Following the start of the Trump's new administration on 20 January 2025, the US government has aggressively targeted consulting spending, resulting in over 120 Deloitte federal contracts being cut, modified, or terminated. While initial reports noted 63 cancellations, updated figures show over 127 contracts potentially affected, part of a wider cost-cutting drive by the Department of Government Efficiency (DOGE). Despite the roughly $2.6 billion in professional services provided by Deloitte in FY2024, these reductions have caused the firm to plan layoffs in its US government consulting practice.

The General Services Administration (GSA) has demanded that top consulting firms, including Deloitte, submit detailed reports justifying their pricing models and work types from 2019 to 2024.

== Sponsorships ==
Deloitte LLP has served as the official professional services sponsor of the United States Olympic Committee since 2009. The UK member firm of Deloitte was a sponsor of the 2012 Summer Olympics and the Royal Opera House. The Canadian member firm was also the official professional services supplier for the 2010 Vancouver Winter Olympic Games and 2010 Winter Paralympic Games.

In Asia, the Singapore member firm of Deloitte was a sponsor of the 2010 Summer Youth Olympics. The Australian member firm of Deloitte is a Founding Partner of Invictus Games Sydney 2018, and a Principal from the firm's consulting practice is CEO of the not-for-profit entity delivering the Games.

Moreover, Deloitte sponsors many university sports teams and societies, such as the Edinburgh University Hockey Club. It also entered into a 3-year partnership with the Cambridge Union Society in November 2013. Deloitte has also become involved in motorsport sponsorship, with the team acting as the title sponsor for the No. 37 TOM'S Toyota Supra team as TGR Team Deloitte TOM'S in the 2023 Super GT series.

In May 2017, Deloitte entered into a partnership with McLaren Applied Technologies (MAT) to combine Deloitte's experience in delivering large consulting projects and MAT's experience of engineering, sensors, simulation and analytical analysis. Prior to this, MAT had entered into a similar partnership with competitor KPMG in a ten-year deal in 2014 but it was terminated by KPMG in 2017. The partnership was later extended to MAT sister company McLaren Racing in June 2020 where Deloitte will work with McLaren to enhance the performance of the team and its cars. In May 2023, Deloitte and McLaren Racing signed a multi-year partnership extension. In January 2026, Deloitte and McLaren Racing signed a partnership expansion with Deloitte becoming the official transformation partner, where Deloitte will support the McLaren F1 Team, the McLaren IndyCar Team and the upcoming McLaren WEC Hypercar Team. The deal also includes the Deloitte logo appearing on the cars across the three teams.

In May 2022, Deloitte signed a three-year sponsorship deal worth more than USD300,000 with the Football Association of Singapore to be the first title sponsor of the Singapore Women’s Premier League as the Deloitte Women's Premier League.

== See also ==
- Accounting networks and associations
- Big Four accounting firms
- Deloitte Fast 500
- Deloitte Football Money League
- Deloitte Real Estate
- Financial audit
- Sarbanes–Oxley Act
- Tax advisor
- Venmyn Rand
