= J. Michael Cook =

- Education: BSBA degree at University of Florida (1964)
- Occupation: former chairman & CEO of Deloitte & Touche, LLP
- Spouse: Mary Anne Cook
- Children: Jennifer; Angela; Jeffrey

J. Michael Cook is the former chairman and CEO of Deloitte & Touche, LLP and currently serves as a member of the GAO Accountability Advisory Panel, and also serves on numerous corporate and civic boards.

== Education ==
Cook is an honors graduate of the University of Florida. While an undergraduate, he became a member of Delta Tau Delta. He graduated with a BSBA degree in 1964, and was named a distinguished alumnus of the university in 1986.

== CEO of Deloitte & Touche ==
Cook became a managing partner of Deloitte Haskins Sells in 1984. In 1986, J. Michael Cook succeeded Charles Steele as chairman and chief executive of Deloitte Haskins & Sells. During his tenure as CEO, Cook helped architect the merger of Deloitte, Haskins, & Sells with Touche Ross in 1989. He became CEO of the new Deloitte & Touche in 1989.

== Other work ==
Cook has chaired the audit committees at Burt's Bees, Comcast Corporation, and Eli Lilly and Company. He has also served as Chairman of United Way of Tri-State, on the Board of Overseers at Business School, the Board of Trustees of the University of Miami, and is a past Chairman of the Board of Governors of the United Way of America.

Cook has an endowed professorship named after him at his Alma mater, the University of Florida. The J. Michael Cook/Deloitte Professorship Fund is awarded to professors in the Warrington College of Business Administration.

He is also the partial namesake of a doctoral consortium hosted by the American Accounting Association devoted to discussing current topics in accounting education, research and publishing.

== Awards ==
- Chief Executive Officer Recognition Award from Women in Technology International - Working Mother Magazine's Family Champion of the Year Award - Director's Alert 2002 Outstanding Director in Corporate America - The John J. McCloy Award of the Public Oversight Board for contributions to excellence in auditing

== Personal life ==
Cook lives with his wife, Mary Anne, in Greenwich, Connecticut. He has two daughters, Jennifer and Angela; and a son, Jeffrey.
