= Venmyn Deloitte =

South African corporation

- Formerly: Venmyn Rand
- Type: Subsidiary
- Industry: Mining
- Founded: 1988; 38 years ago
- Founder: Andy Clay and Dr Willo Stear
- Headquarters: Sandton, Johannesburg, South Africa
- Area served: Worldwide
- Key people: Andy Clay (Managing Director); Neil McKenna (Director)
- Products: Techno-economic mineral valuation reports
- Number of employees: 24 (2019)
- Parent: Deloitte
- Website: venmyndeloitte.com

Venmyn Deloitte is a wholly owned subsidiary of Deloitte that focuses on the global mineral industry. The company provides consulting services, bridging the disciplines of mining and finance. It is headquartered in Sandton, Johannesburg, South Africa.

== History ==
=== Foundation 1988 - 2005 ===
Venmyn Rand was established in 1988 by Andy Clay and Dr Willo Stear, with the financial assistance of Rand Merchant Bank (RMB). Venmyn Rand, which received the second part of its name from this prior association, remained part of RMB for the next 9 years.

It was absorbed into RMB Resources but later purchased back by the original founders. In 1997, Clay and Stear led a management buyout of Venmyn. The founders increased their shareholding to 50% each. It then went through several shareholder changes.

=== 2005 - present ===
The shareholding structure changed several times after September 2005, when co-founder Stear sold his share of the company. At this point, several minority shareholders were introduced. Minority shareholders and their stakes in the company changed periodically thereafter. Clay’s shareholding was also periodically readjusted.

In 2008 the company decided to start running the graphics section of the company as a stand-alone business. Known as Interaction, the stand-alone company was 56% owned by Venmyn, with Interaction staff owning the remainder. This business became fully owned by Venmyn in 2012.

In 2011, Venmyn started a new project management business unit known as Venmyn Independent Projects, it operated as a division of the then Venmyn, co-ordinating and managing feasibility studies and preliminary economic assessments.

In 2012, Deloitte purchased Venmyn establishing Venmyn Deloitte.

== Operations ==
The company had had a flat management structure with company employees writing the technical reports with which they were the most familiar and with which they have the most experience.

== Innovations ==
=== Mineral codes ===
The company Managing Director, Andy Clay and other staff members have assisted with drafting the SAMREC and SAMVAL codes that govern the South African minerals industry. The South African Code for the Reporting of Mineral Resources and Mineral Reserves (SAMREC) sets out minimum standards, recommendations and guidelines for the public reporting of exploration results, mineral resources and mineral reserves in South Africa while the South African Code for the Valuation of Mineral Assets (SAMVAL) sets down the minimum standards, recommendations and guidelines for the valuation of mineral assets.

Clay has been part of the SAMREC/SAMVAL Working Group for oil and gas reserves and has been identified as "instrumental in motivating" for SAMREC’s introduction at the JSE Limited.

Other codes used by the company that relate to the reporting of mineral resource classifications and their valuation include Canada’s NI43-101 Code and Cimval Code and Australia’s Joint Ore Reserves Committee (JORC) Code and Valmin Code.

=== Mine Recovery Factor ===
Andy Clay and Willo Stear coined the term the "mine recovery factor", which is widely used in the industry. The term "measures the actual yield divided by the amount of gold [or other commodity] called for by the miner from the ore reserve".

=== Summary documentation ===
The company introduced the Section 12 Executive Summary document to the JSE Limited, when it submitted the technical reports relating to the Platmin listing. The summary is attached as an appendix to a prelisting document and is based on a Competent Persons' Report (CPR). The Section 12 Executive Summary condenses all the required technical information that forms part of a CPR and presents it in an investor- and board-friendly form.

=== Short-form documentation ===
With a focus on succinct documentation Venmyn has created summarised document types, including Technical, Metallurgical and Environmental Statements.

In 2009, it produced the shortest CPR for a listing, with the listing of Buildmax. The document was less than 10 pages including graphics.

== Notes ==
1. Boyd, M, 2008, The New Reformation: Corporate Governance in Mining, Chamber of Mines, June –September, 2008,
2. Ernst & Young, 2009, Mergers and Acquisitions – A review of activity for the year 2008, 18th Edition, Transaction Advisory Services
3. Le Roux, H, 2006, Codes being Firmed up to Protect SA against Mining Fraud, Mining Weekly, 31 July 2006,
4. McKay, D, KCM Needs the Kiss of Life, Miningmx, 2 February 2009,
5. McKenna, N, 2009, Increasing Disclosure, Decreasing Costs, Venmyn newsletter, 24 June 2009
6. Mining Weekly, 1998, Niche Consultancy Grows, 21–27 August 1998, pg14
7. Venmyn Deloitte Website [VenmynDeloitte.com]
8. Wait, M, 2012, Deloitte acquires mining consultancy Venmyn, Mining Weekly
9. Walker, J, 2000, JSE Takes on World-class Rulebook for Mining, Business Times, undated 2000, pg 7
10. Walker, J, 1990, Venmyn’s Mine Recovery Factor an Eye-opener, Sunday Times, Business Times, 21 October 1990
11. Walker, J, 1997, Venmyn Rand goes it alone, Business Times,
