= Philip Services Corp =

Canadian industrial company

Philip Services Corp.
- Industry: Industrials
- Fate: Bankruptcy in 1999 and 2003
- Headquarters: Hamilton, Ontario, Canada
- Key people: Robert Karey Waxman, Allen Fracassi

Philip Services Corp. was a Canadian recycler based in Hamilton, Ontario. It was accused of accounting fraud in its 1997 financial statements and filed for bankruptcy under Chapter 11 in 1999.

== History and Ownership ==
Carl Icahn led the restructuring negotiations during Philip's first bankruptcy in 1999. Icahn and partners owned 14% of the company's common equity and were the largest holders of Philips debt at the time, with approximately $200 million of debt.

== Accounting fraud and settlement ==
A class action launched on behalf of US investors against Philip's Canadian auditor Deloitte & Touche LLP was settled in 2007 with Deloitte agreeing to pay US$50.5 million. As part of the settlement, the insurance company for directors and officers agreed to pay $18.25 million. The underwriters of Philip's 1997 stock offering, Merrill Lynch and Salomon Brothers, agreed to pay a total of $11 million as part of the same settlement.

== Criminal prosecution and regulatory actions ==
- In 2014, Robert K. Waxman, former president of Philips' metals trading division, was convicted of four counts of fraud over $5,000 and sentenced to a total of 26 years in prison. The sentences were 8 years, 8 years, 5 years and 5 years respectively, with the sentences to be served concurrently. Waxman was charged by the RCMP in 2007 of "elaborate frauds and thefts" totalling over US$17 million in 1996 and 1997.
- David Graham Hoey and John Alexander Woodcroft, both former executives of Philip Services were sanctioned in 2012 by the self-regulatory body for chartered accountants in Ontario, the Institute for Chartered Accountants of Ontario. Both were fined CAD$10,000 and suspended for two years. Hoey was senior vice president finance for Philip in 1997 and Woodcroft was executive vice president of operations at the same time.
- The Ontario Securities Commission agreed to fines and bans for five of Philip's senior executives in March 2006:
  - Allen Fracassi, former chief executive officer, was banned from serving as a director or officer of a company for 12 years, and fined $100,000.
  - Phillip Fracassi, former chief operating officer, was banned from serving as a director or officer of a company for 10 years, and fined $100,000. Allen and Phillip Fracassi are brothers.
  - Marvin Boughton, former chief financial officer, was banned from serving as a director or officer of a company for 10 years, and fined $100,000.
  - John Woodcroft was banned from serving as a director or officer of a company for 10 years, and fined $100,000.
  - Graham Hoey was banned from serving as a director or officer of a company for 5 years, and fined $100,000.
