= William Whitfield (architect) =

British architect (1920–2019)

Sir William Whitfield CBE
- Born: 21 October 1920; Stockton-on-Tees, England
- Died: 16 March 2019 (aged 98)
- Education: King's College, Durham University
- Occupations: Architect and town planner

Sir William Whitfield CBE (21 October 1920 – 16 March 2019) was a British architect and town planner.

== Early life ==
Whitfield was born in Stockton-on-Tees into a coal-owning family and studied architecture at King's College, Newcastle (later the Newcastle University School of Architecture, Planning and Landscape), where he was admitted by a special dispensation at the unusually early age of 15, and where he later studied Town Planning after the Second World War.

== Career ==
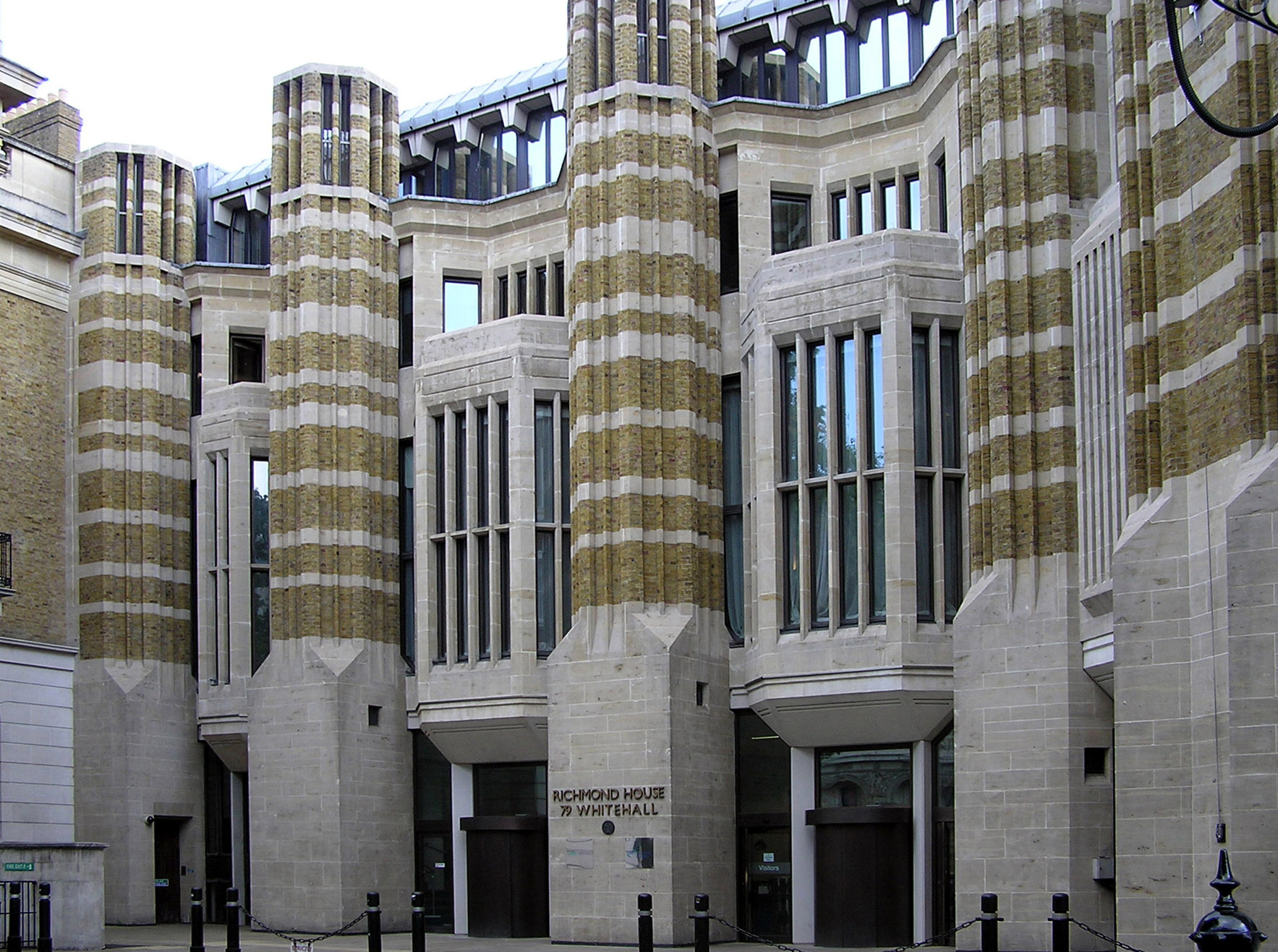
Richmond House, 79 Whitehall, London, completed in 1987.

Whitfield designed the Glasgow University Library (1968) and the Hunterian Museum and Art Gallery Extension at the University of Glasgow (1962–81), as well as an extension to the Newcastle University Students' Union building (1964) and University Theatre (now unrecognisable and called the Northern Stage). He designed the business school and the science library at Durham University (both now extended) as well as the departments of geography and psychology, and was a co-author of the 1969 development plan for the university. In 1970 a major bush-hammered concrete Brutalist extension to Whitfield's design was opened at Arthur Beresford Pite and John Belcher's 1890-1893 Institute of Chartered Accountants headquarters, Chartered Accountants' Hall, including a new entrance. He also designed the 1987 Department of Health building, Richmond House in Richmond Terrace, Whitehall, London. He designed the Chapter House at St Albans Cathedral, the Catheral Lodge in the close at Canterbury Cathedral and the new Mappa Mundi Library at Hereford Cathedral in a free gothic style.

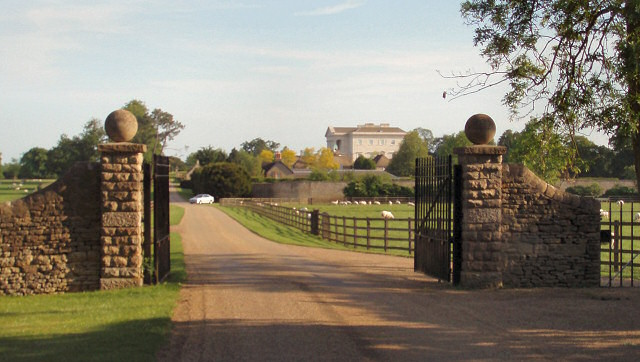
Tusmore Park

With Andrew Lockwood he designed the neo-Palladian mansion Tusmore Park in Oxfordshire for the Saudi Arabian financier Wafic Saïd.

He was Surveyor of the Fabric of St Paul's Cathedral from 1985 to 1990, architect for the restoration of Christ Church Spitalfields, a Commissioner of English Heritage, Commissioner of the Royal Fine Art Commission and a Trustee of the British Museum. He was appointed Commander of the Order of the British Empire (CBE) in the 1976 Birthday Honours, and knighted in the 1993 New Year Honours for services to architecture.
