= Alexander Beleschenko =

British artist working in glass

Alexander Beleschenko (born 1951) is a British artist working in glass who creates architectural glass installations.

== Biography ==
Alexander Beleschenko was born in Corby, Northamptonshire to Ukrainian parents. He initially studied painting at Winchester School of Art 1969-72 and printmaking at the Slade School of Fine Art, London 1973–75. After winning the John Brinkley Fellowship at Norwich School of Art and time spent living in Florence, he went on to study Architectural Stained Glass at Swansea School of Art, 1978–79.

Alexander Beleschenko's works include the cone wall in Southwark tube station in London, the Heart of Wales in the Senedd Welsh Assembly Building in Cardiff, the façade portal doors for Herz Jesu Kirche in Munich and glazed facades for the Forum Building, University of Exeter.

Alexander Beleschenko has twice been awarded the Art and Architecture Award from the Royal Society of Arts. He is a Fellow of the Royal Society of Arts, an Honorary Fellow of the Royal Institute of British Architects, an Honorary Fellow of Swansea Metropolitan University, and an Honorary Doctor of the University of Exeter

He lives and works in Swansea.

== Selected Projects ==
- 2022 Members' room, Chartered Accountants' Hall, London
- 2015 Swimming pool, spa area wall, Holland Green Spa, London
- 2014 Entrance screens, Royal Liverpool University Hospital
- 2014 Entrance screen, Torquay House, London
- 2012 Entrance reception area screens, Landmark Tower, Abu Dhabi
- 2011 Glazed facades, University of Exeter
- 2011 Entrance reception area wall, Baker Street, London
- 2010 Entrance level access to building, Glass Tower, Neuenbeken, Germany
- 2010 Glass façade, Kendrew Quad Café, St John's College, Oxford (link)
- 2010 Glass façade, Blackhall Road, St John's College, Oxford
- 2009 Entrance façades, Templeback, Bristol
- 2008 Glass columns in atrium area, Cruise ship, ‘Solstice’
- 2008 Facade glass, The Quad Arts Centre, Derby
- 2008 Atrium glass wall, Fitzrovia, London
- 2007 Glass canopies, phase 2, Washington Square, Workington
- 2006 Pulpitum screen, Ewenny Priory, Bridgend, Wales
- 2006 Glass canopies, phase 1, Washington Square, Workington
- 2006 Floor piece, Senedd Cymru, Cardiff, Wales
- 2005 Screen, Royal London Hospital, London
- 2005 Screens (Collaboration with Raffaella Sirtoli), Trinity Church in the City of Boston, Boston, USA
- 2004 Sculptures The Met Office, Exeter
- 2004 External wall panels, Princes Street, London
- 2004 Entrance Lobby artwork (Collaboration with Bruce MacLean), Hanover Street, London
- 2003 Frieze.Queen Victoria Street, London
- 2003 Bridge balustrades, Millennium Place, Coventry
- 2002 Canary Wharf B1 Corridor glass walls, Canary Wharf, London
- 2002 Link glass walls, Canary Wharf, London
- 2000 Façade portal doors., Herz Jesu Kirche, Munich, Germany
- 2000 Stairwell balustrades, The Lighthouse, Glasgow
- 1998 Cone wall, Intermediate Concourse, Southwark tube station, London
- 1997 Windows, Prayer Rooms, Neue Messe, Munich
- 1995 Windows, Galton Bridge Station, Birmingham
- 1995 Windows, Jewellery Quarter Bridge Station, Birmingham
- 1993 Atrium Screens, Garden Quad, St John's College, Oxford
- 1992 Windows, County Council Offices, Winchester
- 1992 Suspended panels, Church of Christ the Cornerstone, Milton Keynes
- 1991 Suspended work, Birmingham International Convention Centre, Birmingham
- 1988 Suspended work, County Hall, Chelmsford, Essex
- 1986 Window, Stockley Park, Outer London
