= A. F. Ferguson & Co. =

Pakistani accounting firm

A.F. Ferguson & Co.
- Type: Accountancy network
- Industry: Professional services
- Founded: 1893
- Founder: Alexander Fletcher Ferguson
- Successor: A. F. Ferguson & Co. (Pakistan); Ferguson Maidment & Co. (UK); A. F. Ferguson & Co. (India); Hoda Vasi Chowdhury & Co. (Bangladesh)
- Headquarters: Bombay, Karachi, Lahore, Islamabad, London, Dhaka, Kabul
- Area served: British India (1893–1947); UK (1912-present); Pakistan (1952-present); India (1952–2004); Bangladesh (1963–1972)
- Products: Accounting; Tax; Business consulting

A.F. Ferguson & Co. was a British Indian accounting firm founded in 1893. Today it is based in Pakistan.

== History ==
The origins of the firm go back to 1893. Alexander Fletcher Ferguson (A. F. Ferguson), a chartered accountant from Scotland, came to Bombay in 1889 as chief accountant for the merchant firm Ritchie Stewart & Co., (later Forbes Forbes Campbell & Co. (Private) Limited). In 1893, he began his practice and was the first British chartered accountant to do so in this part of the world. P. G. Irvine, previously an assistant, became a partner in 1898 and the name of the firm was changed to Ferguson & Irvine. In 1902, owing to the ill-health of Irvine, the partnership was dissolved and the firm became A. F. Ferguson & Co., with A. F. Ferguson and W. Turner Green as partners. The firm prospered in Bombay and the Karachi office was opened on 20 March 1908. The Lahore office opened in 1926.

After the partition of India, the Pakistani practice was split off from the firm in 1952. The Pakistani section took over the Karachi and Lahore branches. The Indian branch continued to practice in India under the same name.

In 2012, Omar Zakhilwal, then-finance minister of Afghanistan, accused A.F. Ferguson & Co. of massive fraud involving approximately $900 million.

== Successor firms ==
=== Pakistan ===
The present company situated in Pakistan is the main successor of the previous A. F. Ferguson & Co. in British India. It is the oldest and one of the largest professional accounting firms in Pakistan. A.F. Ferguson & Co. operates under PricewaterhouseCoopers and is also known internationally as PricewaterhouseCoopers Pakistan (PwC Pakistan). This firm also has an office in Kabul, Afghanistan.

=== United Kingdom ===
Logo of Ferguson Maidment & Co.

In 1912, Alexander Fletcher Ferguson left India and opened a branch in London. The London office adopted the name Ferguson, Gilchrist & Co in 1925. This branch was known as Ferguson, Rowland & Davis from 1954. In 1981, the firm merged with Maidment & Co and its name was changed to Ferguson Maidment & Co.

=== India ===
In 2004, A.F. Ferguson & Co. integrated its operations with Deloitte in India.

=== Bangladesh ===
Logo of Hoda Vasi Chowdhury & Co.

In 1963, a new office was opened in Dhaka, capital of East Pakistan. After the independence of Bangladesh, this branch was split and renamed Hoda Vasi Chowdhury & Co.
