= William Welch Deloitte =

British accountant (1818–1898)

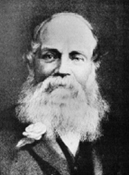
- Born: 13 February 1818; London, England
- Died: 23 August 1898 (aged 80)
- Occupation: Accountant
- Known for: Being a founding father of accounting; Founder of Deloitte

William Welch Deloitte (13 February 1818 – 23 August 1898) was a British accountant and the founder of the professional services firm that subsequently became Deloitte Touche Tohmatsu in the United States and Coopers & Lybrand Deloitte in the United Kingdom. He was born in London, England. He was one of the fathers of the accountancy profession.

== Early life ==
Deloitte started his career in accounting early. At the age of 15, he became an assistant to the Official Assignee at the Bankruptcy Court in the City of London, where he learned the accounting business.

== Career ==
At the age of 25, Deloitte opened his own office opposite the Bankruptcy Court in Basinghall Street. He made his name with the industry of the day—the railways—and in 1849 at the Great Western Railway.

He discovered fraud perpetrated on the Great Northern Railway by Leopold Redpath, invented a system for railway accounts that protected investors from mismanagement of funds, and was to become the grand old man of the profession. When Deloitte retired from Deloitte, Plender, Griffiths & Co. in 1897, one year before his death, he was the oldest practising accountant.

He served as president of the newly created Institute of Chartered Accountants between 1888 and 1889. He died in 1898.
