= The Accountant (magazine) =

Accounting magazine published in the UK

- Editor: Joe Pickard
- Staff writers: Joe Pickard, Santiago Bedoya-Pardo
- Categories: Accounting magazine
- Frequency: Monthly
- Founded: 1874
- Company: GlobalData
- Country: United Kingdom
- Based in: London
- Language: English
- Website: theaccountant-online.com

The Accountant is the "oldest accountancy journal in the world". It was initially developed as a journal of accountancy issues in the UK, but has since expanded to cover broad global issues. Today, The Accountant is published monthly and reports on a range of topics, including changes in accounting standards, corporate reporting, audit quality, staff shortages, technology, IFRS, succession planning, tax and auditor liability.

== History ==
The Accountant was established in 1874 as a journal for the accountancy profession. Its first publisher was Alfred Gee who wanted the publication to be independent. As the Institute of Chartered Accountants in England and Wales explains in its library database, Gee didn't want the magazine to be affiliated with any professional body, although in 1890 ICAEW's council encouraged its members to subscribe and submit articles for publication.

The Accountant was originally published monthly but switched to a weekly publication date after January 1875. It developed a reputation for campaigning on issues of importance for accountants from its first edition— which called for accountants to lay aside rivalries and work together to develop the profession.

From 1890, members of the Institute of Chartered Accountants in England and Wales (ICAEW) were encouraged to subscribe and submit material to the publication, whilst publisher Alfred Gee persuaded several societies to advertise, making it a reputable publication.

Gee & Co published The Accountant in 1980. Since then, the publication has undergone several ownership changes and was acquired by current owners Progressive Digital Media in 2012.

== Coverage ==
Issues regularly include a region up, feature articles, analysis, comments, and interviews with senior figures in the profession. The Accountant produces proprietary research in the form of Country Surveys of professional bodies. These reports provide an analysis of the most important professional issues in national accountancy markets. They also survey professional bodies for student and membership data.

First World War

According to the ICAEW. The Accountant published two columns during the First World War, entitled ‘'Roll of Honour'’ and ‘'News from the Front'’.

“The column 'Roll of Honour' listed individuals who were missing, killed in action, wounded, or who had been awarded medals. The column 'News from the front' included details of individuals who had received commissions, were awarded medals, or were recognized for their bravery. The level of information provided varies from entry to entry, but in many cases, there is more detail in the journal. Details for 929 individuals are recorded in this index (615 recording deaths, 314 recording other news).”

== Publication ==
An inaugural world survey of the accountancy profession was published in the December 2009 edition of The Accountant (Issue 6073) which provides details of membership numbers for 37 professional accountancy bodies in 24 countries. In addition to this, a league table of the 'Top 20 World's largest professional accountancy bodies by membership' was published.

- Job moves & recruitment trends
- News from the professional bodies
- Comparative perspectives on service providers
- Identification & analysis of key market trends
- Regulatory developments from a global perspective
- Updates and analysis of the standard setting process
- Market commentary and predictions from industry leaders

== Readership ==
The Accountant is read by professional accounting bodies, university students, standard-setting bodies, regulators and accountants.

The ICAEW Library & Information Service holds a complete run of The Accountant.
