= RSM =

RSM may refer to:

== Companies ==
- RSM Global, worldwide accountancy & professional services network
  - RSM US, a tax, accounting and consulting firm based in Chicago
  - RSM UK
  - RSM Singapore
  - RSM Tenon, defunct professional services network in the UK
  - RSM Robson Rhodes, defunct professional services network in the UK
- Reliable Source Music, an independent production music company
- Renault Samsung Motors, a South Korean motor manufacturer

== Institutions ==
- Rotterdam School of Management (RSM Erasmus University), the business school of Erasmus University, Rotterdam
- Royal Saskatchewan Museum, a museum in Regina, Saskatchewan
- Royal School of Mines, an institute of higher education in London, England
- Royal Society of Medicine, a British medical society
- Russian School of Mathematics, an after-school mathematical education program based in Massachusetts

== Other organizations ==
- Radioamaterski Sojuz na Makedonija, an amateur radio organization in the Republic of Macedonia
- Religious Order of the Sisters of Mercy, an order of Catholic women
- Rete degli Studenti Medi, Italian High School and VET student union
- Russian Socialist Movement, a socialist political party in Russia
- Rassemblement Saint-Martinois, a political party in Saint Martin
- Rashtriya Sanjay Manch, a political party in India

== Military ==
- Regimental sergeant major a warrant officer appointment in the British and most Commonwealth armies and the Royal Marines
- Resolute Support Mission, a NATO mission in Afghanistan from the end of 2014
- Radio Squadron, Mobile, signal intelligence squadrons of the United States Air Force Security Service

== Places ==
- Rancho Santa Margarita, California, a city in California
- Republic of San Marino, a country in southern Europe
  - Vehicle registration plates of San Marino

== Science and technology ==
- Rating scale model, a model used in Item Response Theory
- Reciprocal Space Map, a crystallographic method
- Response surface methodology, sequential experimentation for improvement and for finding an optimal response
- Reynolds stress model, a method in Computational fluid dynamics for modeling turbulence
- Route Switch Module, a component of a powered device that provides network routing services
- RNA-targeting small molecule drugs, a class of organic compounds with traditional drug properties

== Other uses ==
- R. Stevie Moore (born 1952), American singer-songwriter
- Robert McNamara (1916–2009), American businessman and government official
- Rolling Stones Mobile Studio, a mobile recording studio
