= RSM Tenon =

- Company type: Public Limited Company
- Traded as: LSE: TNO
- Industry: Professional services
- Founded: December 2009
- Defunct: October 2015
- Headquarters: London, United Kingdom
- Key people: Chris Merry; CEO
- Products: Audit; Tax; Advisory
- Revenue: £208.2m (Annual Report 2012)
- Operating income: £5 million (2011 restated)
- Net income: £0.7 million (2011 restated)
- Number of employees: around 2,600

RSM Tenon was a professional services firm based in the United Kingdom, which was listed on the FTSE SmallCap Index and part of RSM Global. The company was formed from the merger of the Tenon Group with RSM Bentley Jennison in December 2009.

The company offered risk management, tax, recovery, financial management and business advisory services. RSM Tenon had been the United Kingdom's seventh largest accounting firm, employing around 2,600 people in 35 offices across the United Kingdom. In November 2011, RSM Tenon was recognised as the ‘National Firm of the Year’ at the 2011 British Accountancy Awards.

In August 2013, the shares of RSM Tenon Group PLC were suspended, and the company went into insolvent administration. The trading subsidiaries were immediately purchased by Baker Tilly UK Holdings through a limited liability partnership. Baker Tilly LLP, in October 2015, re branded itself as RSM UK. RSM UK is a provider of audit, tax and consulting services to middle market leaders, globally.

On 26 October 2015 RSM UK, formerly Baker Tilly LLP, was rebranded as RSM. RSM International, branded RSM, is a multi-national network of accounting firms. The member firms of RSM are independent accounting and advisory firms each of which practices in its own right, and is unified as part of the network. The network is not a separate legal entity of any description in any jurisdiction, and does not provide services.

== History ==
=== Tenon Group ===
Tenon was one of the first accountancy firms in the United Kingdom, not wholly owned by its partners, being a public limited company (PLC) listed on the Alternative Investment Market. It was formed as a "consolidator", inviting existing small local accountancy partnerships to join it and become part of a national company.

It acquired five firms in April 2001 for £60 million, making it the 15th largest and the first PLC in the United Kingdom league table of accountancy firms. In practice, the company found it difficult to integrate these businesses, and its share price dropped to 6.25p in 2003, following the dot-com bubble.

When Tenon was launched, financial audit could not be carried out by a PLC, so the auditors from the predecessor firms formed an associated partnership known as Blueprint Audit. The rules requiring strict separation were relaxed in March 2005. Tenon's public image was characterised by Accountancy Age magazine in April 2010, as "quirky but recognisable entrepreneurial based branding".

=== RSM Bentley Jennison ===
RSM Bentley Jennison was a British firm of Chartered Accountants, founded in 1984 by David Bentley and John Jennison. It had over 1,000 staff in fifteen offices around the United Kingdom in Birmingham, Bristol, Cardiff, Edinburgh, Harrogate, Leeds, London, Manchester, Milton Keynes, Newcastle, Nottingham, Solent, Stoke-on-Trent, Swindon and Telford. It was ranked #14 in the accountancy league table of 2007, of chartered accountants and business advisors.

Bentley Jennison secured a place in the RSM Global network when the original member, Robson Rhodes, merged with Grant Thornton in April 2007. The weekly industry journal Accountancy Age noted that Bentley Jennison had beaten larger rivals to gain this position.

=== Post merger ===
Tenon announced in December 2009 that it was merging with RSM Bentley Jennison in a £76 million deal. Andy Raynor, chief executive of Tenon, initially headed the enlarged firm. The former national managing partner, Tony Stockdale, and other senior staff at RSM Bentley Jennison joined the PLC Board as Executive Directors. RSM branding replaced Tenon's. The firm announced some rationalisation of offices, but planned to expand in Birmingham, Bristol and Leeds.

In February 2010, the Financial Services Authority imposed a £700,000 fine for mis selling of structured finance products by Tenon. RSM Tenon's shares moved up from the AIM to the main United Kingdom London Stock Exchange in May 2010. It is the first accountancy firm to be listed there.

At the end of June 2010, RSM Tenon paid £6.8 million to acquire several offices from rival consolidator Vantis, when the latter entered administration and was broken up. The acquired businesses had a turnover of £27 million in the preceding year, and contributed to a 31% increase in turnover for the year ended June 2011.

PwC, as the auditor of the company, was fined in August 2017 for misconduct in the course of approving the accounts for the accounting year 2010/11, failing to obtain sufficient appropriate audit evidence and [...] to exercise sufficient professional scepticism.

In January 2012, the firm warned of losses "due to pricing pressures amid a difficult economy". Raynor, and the firm's chairman Bob Morton, stepped down. Adrian Martin became Chairman, and Chris Merry was appointed CEO in February 2012. At the end of that month, the firm released half year results showing a loss after a £60 million goodwill write off.

In the aftermath of the company's administration, former finance director Russell McBurnie was excluded from the accountancy profession for five years and fined £57,000 for his part in the listed accountancy firm’s downfall. He was also required to pay £825,000 towards the Financial Reporting Council’s investigative costs.

== Awards ==
RSM Bentley Jennison won the award for Large Firm of the Year, in the Accountancy Age Awards for Excellence 2006.

RSM Tenon won National Firm of the Year, at the British Accountancy Awards 2011.
