= Inga-Stina Robson, Baroness Robson of Kiddington =

Anglo-Swedish political activist (1919-1999)

The Right Honourable The Baroness Robson of Kiddington
- Stina Robson

Member of the House of Lords Lord Temporal
- In office 14 May 1974 – 9 February 1999; Life Peerage

Personal details
- Born: 20 August 1919 Stockholm, Sweden
- Died: 9 February 1999 (aged 79)
- Party: Liberal Democrats
- Spouse: Lawrence Robson (m. 1940)
- Education: Ölinska Girls' School

Coat of arms of Inga-Stina Robson, Baroness Robson of Kiddington

Escutcheon
Or a Viking ship oars in action Sable between two fleurs-de-lys Azure.
Supporters
Dexter a sea stag Argent attired and finned Or, sinister a sea horse also Arget crined and finned Or, the tails Proper and each gorged with a baron's coronet also Proper.

Inga-Stina Robson, Baroness Robson of Kiddington (née Arvidsson; 20 August 1919 – 9 February 1999), often known as Stina Robson, was an Anglo-Swedish political activist.

Born to a wealthy family in Stockholm as Inga-Stina Arvidsson, she attended Ölinska Girls' School before becoming a secretary in the Swedish Ministry for Foreign Affairs' office in London, where she met Lawrence Robson, an accountant, and the two married in 1940. During World War II, she worked as a translator for the British Ministry of Information.

Robson settled at Kiddington Hall near Woodstock, Oxfordshire, and worked on her husband's unsuccessful candidature for the Liberal Party in Banbury at the 1950 general election. Their house was used as a conference centre and was popular for Liberal Party events. In the run-up to the 1955 general election, Lawrence was the Liberals' prospective candidate in Eye, but he was appointed to a government commission and withdrew, leaving Inga-Stina to fight the seat, although she was not successful. Later the same year, she became a magistrate.

Robson stood again in Eye at the 1959 general election, then in Gloucester in 1964 and 1966. Although she never came close to election to Westminster, she was elected to Chipping Norton Rural District Council.

In 1968, Robson became President of the Women's Liberal Federation, standing down in 1970 when she was elected President of the Liberal Party. As president, she opposed radicalism and, in particular, the policies advocated by the National League of Young Liberals. She was created Baroness Robson of Kiddington, of Kiddington in Oxfordshire on 14 May 1974, becoming the Liberals' spokesperson on agriculture and the environment in the House of Lords. In 1982, she succeeded her husband as Chair of the National Liberal Club, and also as Chair of the Anglo-Swedish Society. She joined the Liberal Democrats, successors of the Liberal Party, and in 1988, she chaired a panel investigating fraud in the European Union. She stood down as a magistrate in 1989, by which time she was the longest-serving magistrate in the country. In 1993, she became the party spokesperson on health.

Lady Robson was the Chairman of the charity Attend (then National Association of Leagues of Hospital Friends) from 1986 to 1994. When she retired in 1994, she was honored as vice president; a position she would hold from 1995 to 1998.

Party political offices
Preceded by Gaenor Heathcote Amory	President of the Women's Liberal Federation; 1968–1970	Succeeded by Penelope Jessel
Preceded by Timothy Beaumont	President of the Liberal Party; 1970–1971	Succeeded by Stephen Terrell
