= Kiddington Hall =

Grade II listed manor house in Kiddington, Oxfordshire, England

Coordinates: 51.9026°N 1.4030°W

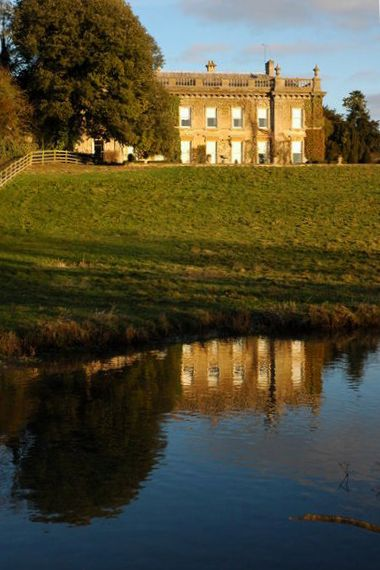
Kiddington Hall viewed from the public footpath which passes through its grounds

Kiddington Hall is a large Grade II listed manor house located in Kiddington, near Woodstock, Oxfordshire, England.

== History ==
Kiddington Hall was built in 1673, and in the 18th century "Capability" Brown laid out the gardens.

The Reverend Thomas Warton, a fellow of Trinity College, Oxford, who was rector of Kiddington for 20 years and poet laureate from 1785, pictures the coming of spring on the estate in his April Ode with "swallows skimming the village green and rooks swarming in the oak trees round the manor house". Estate owner Sir George Browne provided the real-life inspiration for "Sir Plume of amber snuff-box justly vain" in Alexander Pope’s The Rape of the Lock.

In 1840 the estate passed to Mortimer Ricardo, youngest son of the political economist David Ricardo. In 1850 he commissioned the architect Sir Charles Barry to remodel the house in his trademark Italianate architecture style, build a new stable courtyard adjoining the hall to the north, and create formal terraced gardens to the south and west, overlooking Brown's park. Barry rebuilt the house so completely that no external trace of the original building is visible. Beyond the Victorian orangery to the south, a gate leads to the square-towered 14th-century church of St Nicholas, where stained-glass windows commemorate the former High Sheriff of Oxfordshire Henry Lomax Gaskell and his wife, Alice, whose family lived at the Hall from 1855 to 1953.

In 1950 Lawrence Robson, founder of accountancy company Robson Rhodes, rented Kiddington Hall, and then bought it in 1953. From here he and his wife Inga-Stina Robson worked on his unsuccessful candidature for the Liberal Party in Banbury at the 1950 general election. The house was used as a conference centre and was popular for Liberal Party events. In the run-up to the 1955 general election, Lawrence was the Liberals' prospective candidate in Eye, but he was appointed to a government commission and withdrew. This left Inga-Stina to contest the seat, but she was not successful.

On the death of Sir Lawrence in 1982, his son Maurice Robson inherited the house. In September 2009 Maurice placed the entire Kiddington Estate on the market for £42 million, his divorce seemingly being the reason for the sale.

Jemima Khan bought Kiddington Hall in Autumn 2010 for a reported £15 million. The property underwent refurbishment, which was completed in 2012.

== Structure ==
The house is built of pale, honey-coloured Cotswold stone. The entrance and staircase lead to five main reception rooms, which include: a Rococo-style drawing room; a morning room; a richly decorated dining room with twin columns and carved marble fireplace; a library with its Neoclassical friezes; and a panelled billiards room that overlooks the gardens. The main 18th-century staircase leads to two bedroom suites, seven further bedrooms and three bathrooms on the first floor. The back stairs lead to the second floor and 10 attic rooms.

The hall and its adjoining orangery are listed Grade II on the National Heritage List for England, and Kiddington Park is also listed Grade II on the Register of Historic Parks and Gardens.
