= Kiddington =

Village in Oxfordshire, England

Coordinates: 51.903°N 1.400°W

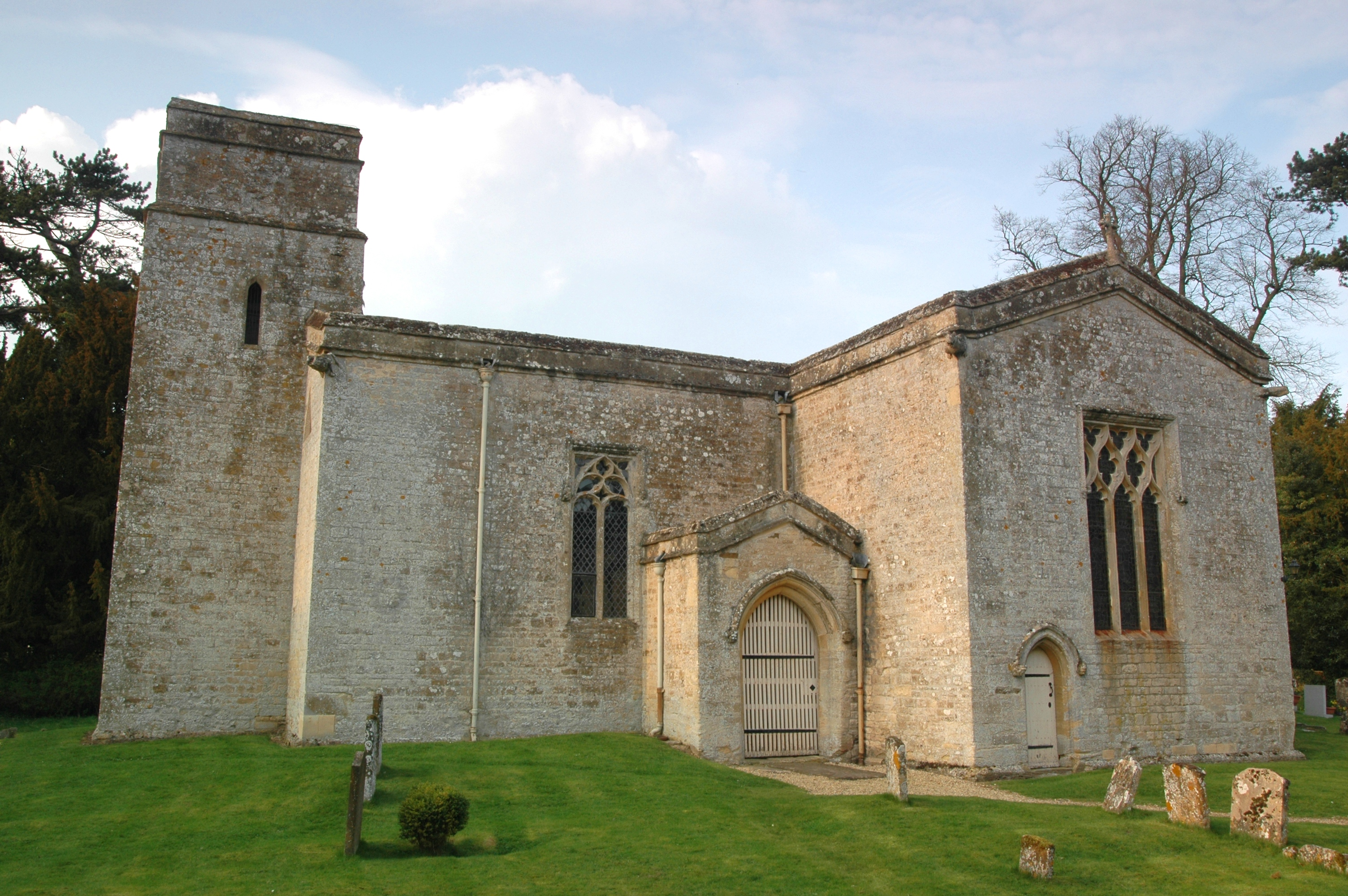
- St Nicholas' parish church

- Location within Oxfordshire
- Population: 113 (parish, including Over Kiddington) (2001 census)
- OS grid reference: SP4123
- Civil parish: Kiddington with Asterleigh
- District: West Oxfordshire
- Shire county: Oxfordshire
- Region: South East
- Country: England
- Sovereign state: United Kingdom
- Post town: Woodstock
- Postcode district: OX20
- Dialling code: 01608
- Police: Thames Valley
- Fire: Oxfordshire
- Ambulance: South Central
- UK Parliament: Witney

Kiddington is a village in the civil parish of Kiddington with Asterleigh, in the West Oxfordshire district, in the county of Oxfordshire, England. The village is on the River Glyme, just north of the A44 road between Woodstock and Chipping Norton, about 7 miles (11 km) southeast of Chipping Norton. In 1891 the parish had a population of 215. On 1 October 1895 the parish was abolished and nerged with Asterleigh to form "Kiddington with Asterleigh".

== Manor ==
The toponym is Old English, recorded in the Domesday Book in 1086 as Chidintone, meaning "estate of a man named Cydda". Historically Cuddington has been an alternative form. It has also been known as Nether Kiddington to distinguish it from the hamlet of Over Kiddington 0.5 miles (800 m) south of the village.

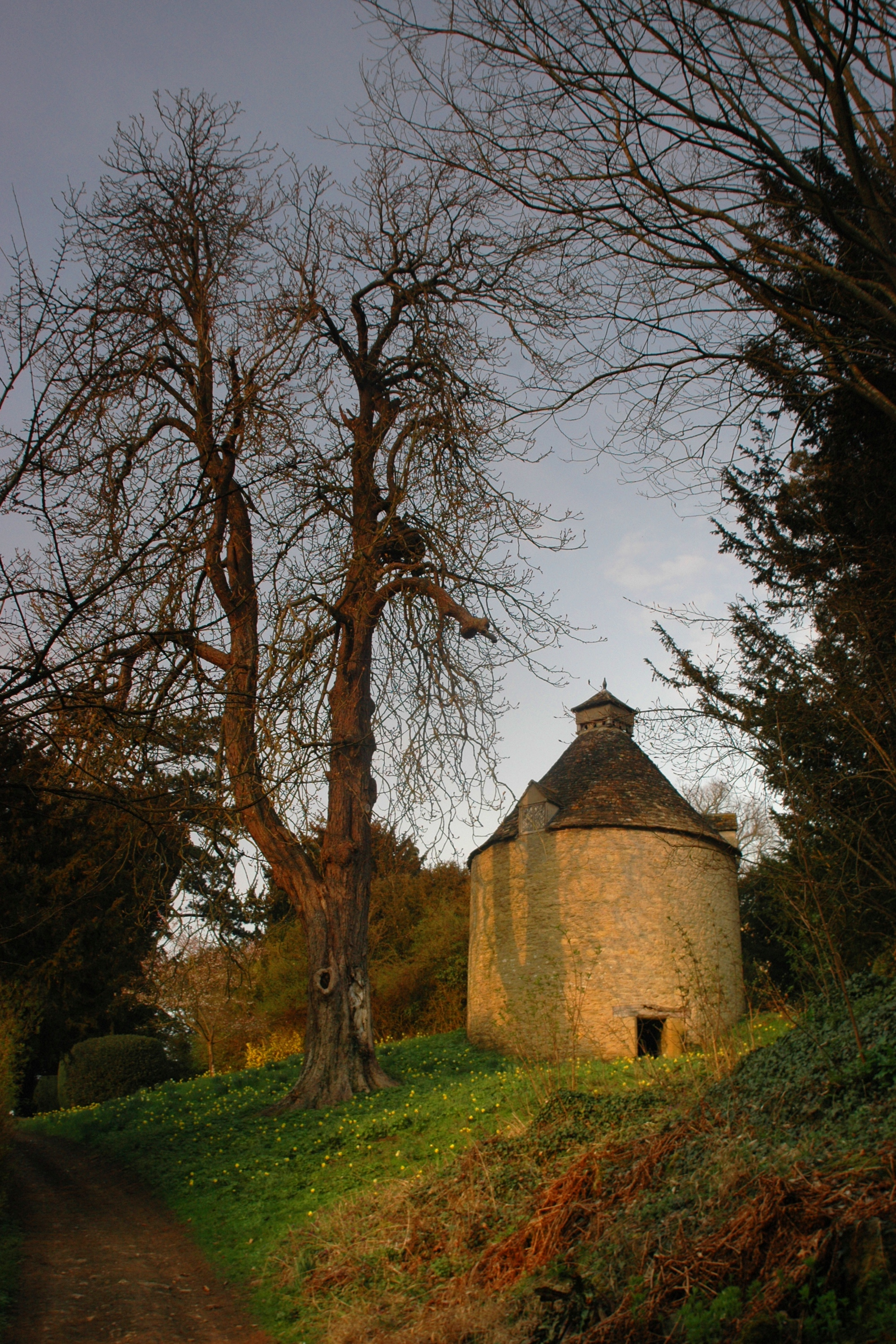
17th century dovecote in the grounds of Kiddington Hall

Offa of Mercia gave Kiddington, with Heythrop, to Worcester Priory in about 780. After the Norman Conquest of England the manor was held successively by the De Salcey, Willescote or Williamscote, Babington, Browne and Browne-Mostyn families. After the English Reformation the Browne family were recusants with their own Roman Catholic chapel and priest, and they ensured the survival of Catholicism in this part of Oxfordshire. Kiddington Hall was built in 1673, and in the 18th century "Capability" Brown laid out the gardens. In 1850 the architect Charles Barry rebuilt the house so completely that no external trace of the original building is visible, added a new stable block and remodelled the gardens.

In 1950 Lawrence Robson, founder of accountancy company Robson Rhodes, bought Kiddington Hall, and on his death in 1982 his son Maurice Robson inherited the house. In September 2009 Maurice placed Kiddington Estate (including Kiddington Hall) on the market for £42 million, his divorce seemingly being the reason for the sale. Jemima Khan bought the property in Autumn 2010 for a reported £15 million.

== Parish church ==
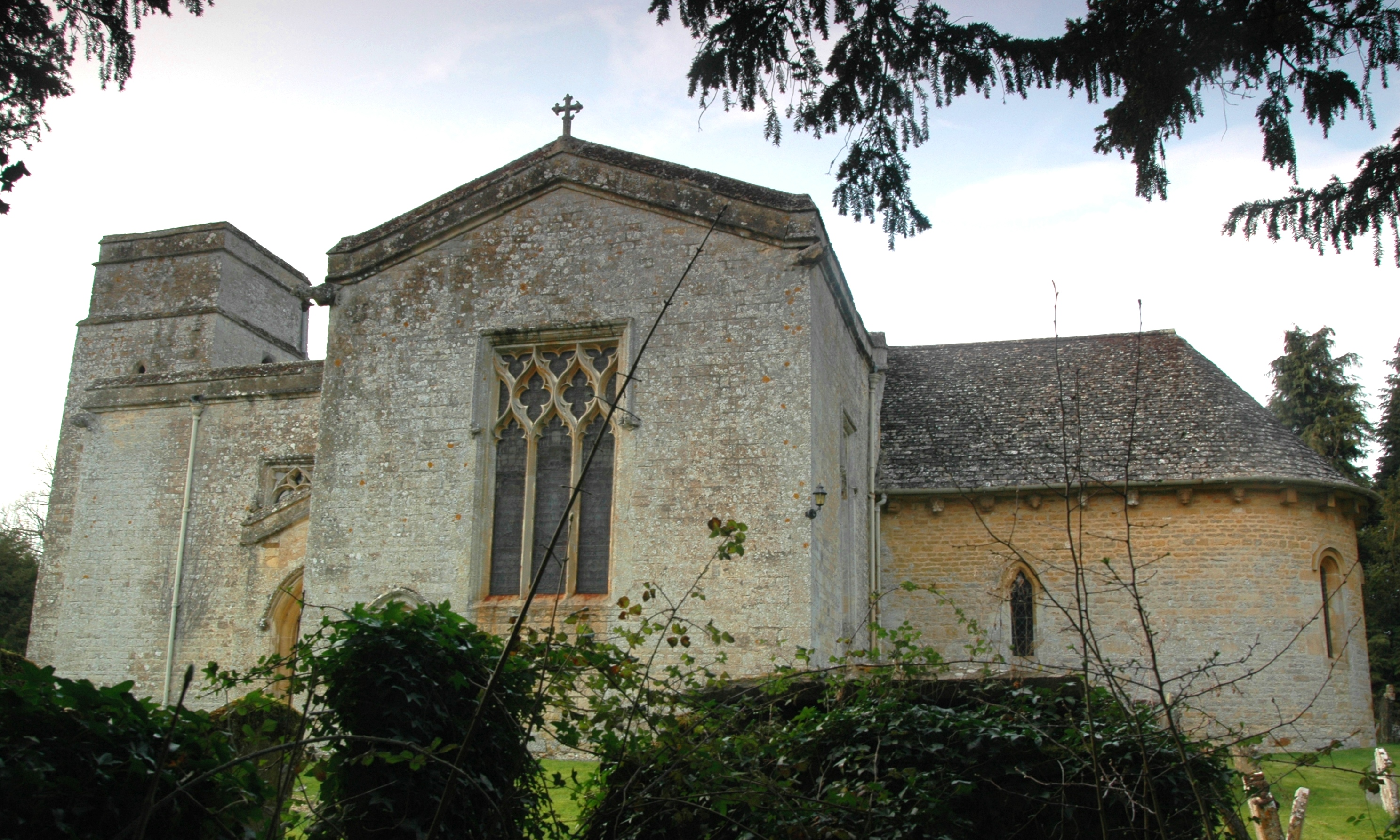
St Nicholas' parish church from the south. On the right is the Norman Revival apsidal chancel designed by G.G. Scott.

The Church of England parish church of Saint Nicholas was Norman, and the original chancel arch survives from this time. The rest of the church was rebuilt about 1400 in the Decorated Gothic style. The chancel was extended westwards so that, unusually amongst parish churches, it has one chancel arch in front of another. The rest of the 14th century rebuilding comprises the nave, a south chapel, south porch and west tower. Later in the Middle Ages a Perpendicular Gothic east window was inserted in the chancel. In 1845 the chancel was rebuilt in its present apsidal form on the original Norman foundations to designs by George Gilbert Scott. In 1848 the Perpendicular Gothic east window was removed and re-used to form sedilia. In 1879 a vestry and organ chamber were added.

The tower has three bells. James Keene of Woodstock cast the tenor bell in 1629. Mears & Stainbank of the Whitechapel Bell Foundry cast the treble bell in 1875. The date and founder of the middle bell are unknown. There is also a smaller bell, now disused, that may have been cast by John Mitchell of Wokingham in about 1493. In 1771 the poet and literary historian Rev. Thomas Warton was appointed rector of St. Nicholas' church. In 1781 he wrote The History and Antiquities of Kiddington, and in 1785 he was made Poet Laureate. Warton remained both rector and Poet Laureate until his death in 1790. St. Nicholas' is now combined in one benefice with the parishes of Wootton and Glympton.

== School ==
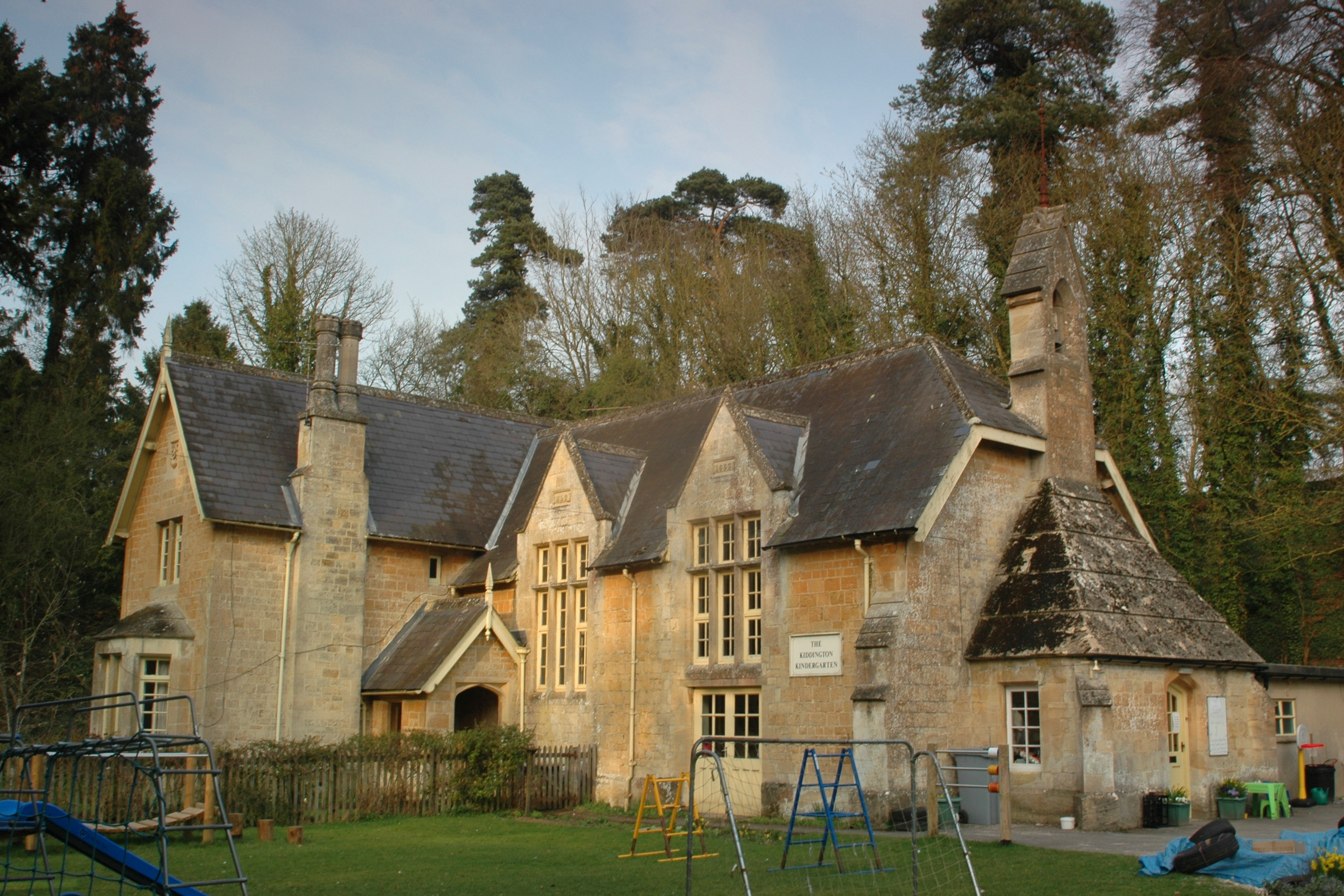
Kiddington Kindergarten, formerly the parish school

Kiddington parish school was built in 1856. It is now a private kindergarten.

== Sources ==
- Hamilton, N.E.S., ed. (1868). The National Gazetteer of Great Britain and Ireland; Or, Topographical Dictionary of the British Isles. London: James S. Virtue.
- Mills, A.D.; Room, A. (2003). A Dictionary of British Place-Names. Oxford: Oxford University Press. ISBN 0-19-852758-6.
- Sherwood, Jennifer; Pevsner, Nikolaus (1974). Oxfordshire. The Buildings of England. Harmondsworth: Penguin Books. pp. 668–670. ISBN 0-14-071045-0.
- Warton, Thomas (1815). The History and Antiquities of Kiddington (3rd ed.). London: J. Nichols, Son & Bentley.
