= Kiddington with Asterleigh =

Civil parish in West Oxfordshire, England

Coordinates: 51.897°N 1.401°W

- Civil parish
- Location within Oxfordshire
- Civil parish: Kiddington with Asterleigh
- District: West Oxfordshire
- Shire county: Oxfordshire
- Region: South East
- Country: England
- Sovereign state: United Kingdom
- Post town: Woodstock
- Postcode district: OX20
- Dialling code: 01608
- Police: Thames Valley
- Fire: Oxfordshire
- Ambulance: South Central
- UK Parliament: Bicester and Woodstock

Kiddington with Asterleigh is a civil parish in West Oxfordshire, England. It contains the small village of Kiddington, the hamlet of Over Kiddington and Asterleigh.
