= Asterleigh =

Deserted medieval village in Oxfordshire, England

Coordinates: 51.897°N 1.417°W

- Location within Oxfordshire
- OS grid reference: SP4022
- Civil parish: Kiddington with Asterleigh
- District: West Oxfordshire
- Shire county: Oxfordshire
- Region: South East
- Country: England
- Sovereign state: United Kingdom
- Post town: Woodstock
- Postcode district: OX20
- Dialling code: 01608
- Police: Thames Valley
- Fire: Oxfordshire
- Ambulance: South Central
- UK Parliament: Witney

Asterleigh, sometimes in the past called Esterley, is a farm and deserted medieval village in the civil parish of Kiddington with Asterleigh, in the West Oxfordshire district, in Oxfordshire, England, about 3 miles (4.8 km) northeast of Charlbury. The site of the former village is about 0.25 miles (400 m) west of the present farm.

== Manor ==
Asterleigh's toponym indicates that it was created by woodland clearance on what would then have been the edge of Wychwood Forest.

The Domesday Book of 1086 does not record Asterleigh as a separate settlement. Medieval pottery found in 1948 suggests that Asterleigh was inhabited by the 12th century. Also in 1948, squared stones were found along with limestone roofing slates that had medieval-style drilled nail-holes.

The earliest known documentary record of Asterleigh is from early in the 13th century. At the time of the Hundred Rolls in 1279 it had 20 farms. However, the village declined and its landowning family decided to leave the village and move to Nether Kiddington.

== Church ==
Asterleigh was an ecclesiastical parish that had its own parish church by 1216. However, in 1466 John Chedworth, Bishop of Lincoln absorbed Asterleigh into the ecclesiastical parish of Kiddington, declaring:

the tenths, oblations, rents and emoluments of the rectory of Asterleigh were so diminished as to be insufficient to support a rector, or even a competent parochial chaplain, on account of the paucity of parishioners, the barrenness of land, defects of husbandry, and an unusual prevalence of pestilences and epidemic sicknesses.

In 1783 the Reverend Thomas Warton reported that "pieces of moulded stone and other antique masonry" had been found at Asterleigh. In 1960 the footings of the church porch were unearthed and reburied.

== Farm and civil parish ==
By the 18th century Asterleigh was no more than a farmhouse. Asterleigh Farm was an extra-parochial area of 300 acres (120 ha) until 1858 when it was made a civil parish. On 1 October 1895 the parish was abolished and merged with Kiddington to form "Kiddington with Asterleigh". In 1891 the parish had a population of 37.

The site of the medieval village and church is now a Scheduled Ancient Monument.

== Sources ==
- Case, Humphrey; Sturdy, David (1960). "Recent Mediaeval Finds in the Oxford Region". Oxoniensia. XXV. Oxford Architectural and Historical Society: 131.
- Emery, Frank (1974). The Oxfordshire Landscape. The Making of the English Landscape. London: Hodder & Stoughton. pp. 101–102. ISBN 0-340-04301-6.
- Jope, E.M. (1948). "Recent Mediaeval Finds in the Oxford Region". Oxoniensia. XIII. Oxford Architectural and Historical Society: 67–69.
- Page, W.H., ed. (1907). A History of the County of Oxford, Volume 2. Victoria County History. Archibald Constable & Co. pp. 1–63.
- Warton, Thomas (1783). The History and Antiquities of Kiddington (2nd ed.). pp. 17–21.
- Warton, Thomas (1815). The History and Antiquities of Kiddington (3rd ed.). London: J. Nichols, Son & Bentley. p. 23.
