= Over Kiddington =

Hamlet in Oxfordshire, England

Coordinates: 51.898°N 1.406°W

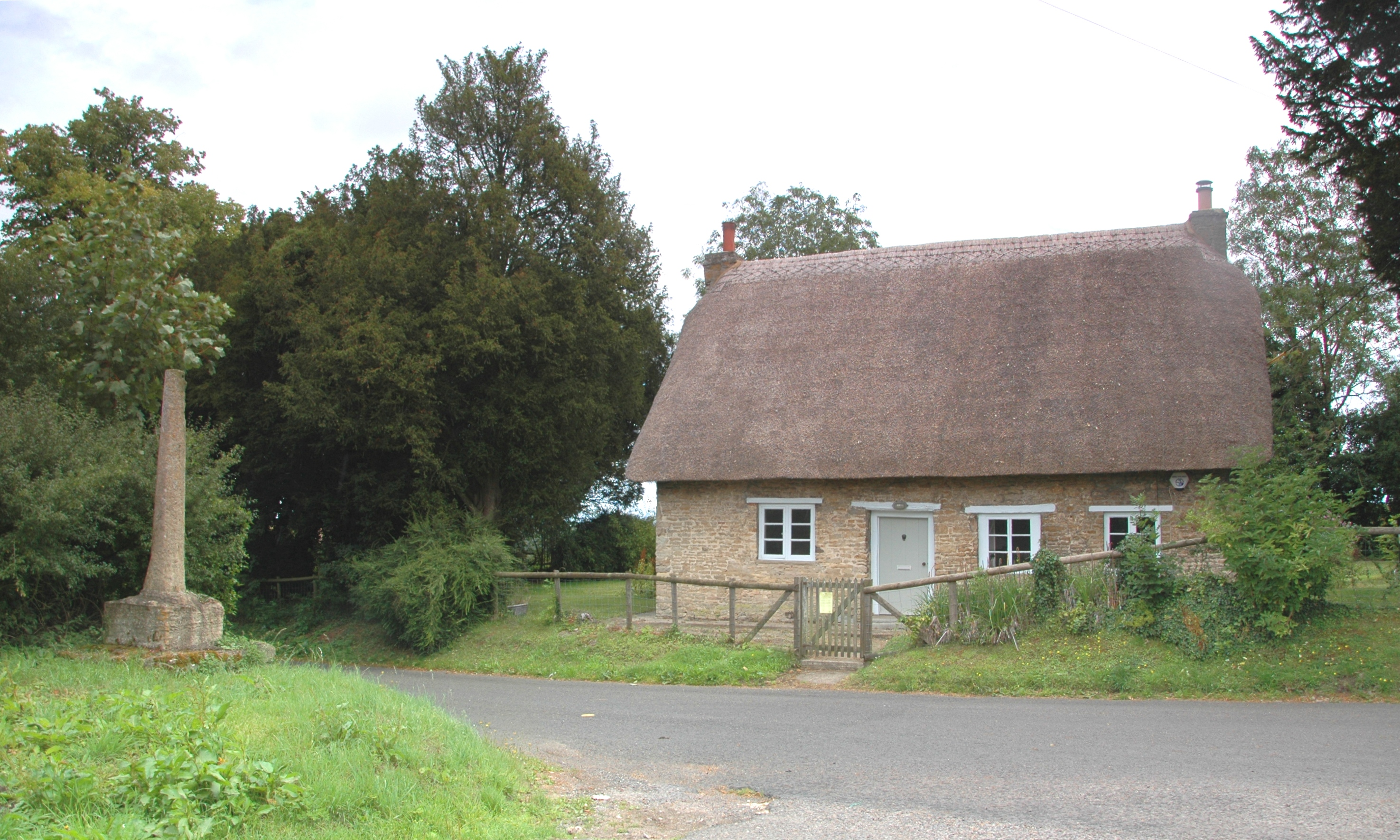
- Late medieval preaching cross and 18th century Cross Cottage

- Location within Oxfordshire
- OS grid reference: SP4122
- Civil parish: Kiddington with Asterleigh
- District: West Oxfordshire
- Shire county: Oxfordshire
- Region: South East
- Country: England
- Sovereign state: United Kingdom
- Post town: Woodstock
- Postcode district: OX20
- Dialling code: 01608
- Police: Thames Valley
- Fire: Oxfordshire
- Ambulance: South Central
- UK Parliament: Witney

Over Kiddington is a hamlet in the civil parish of Kiddington with Asterleigh in Oxfordshire, England, about 7 miles (11 km) southeast of Chipping Norton. Over Kiddington is on the main road between Woodstock and Chipping Norton, which since the 1990s has been classified as part of the A44 trunk road (previously the A34). The hamlet is at the crossroads where the minor road to Kiddington village and Ditchley Park house crosses the main road. The crossroads is overhung by a large cedar tree that is a notable landmark.

== History ==
Over Kiddington has the base and shaft of a preaching cross that may have been erected in the 15th century. The Chequers is an L-shaped house that was built in the 17th century. It used to be a public house but is now a private home. Opposite the cross is Cross Cottage, a stone cottage built in the 18th century. Over Kiddington used to have a post office, but it is now closed.

== Gallery ==
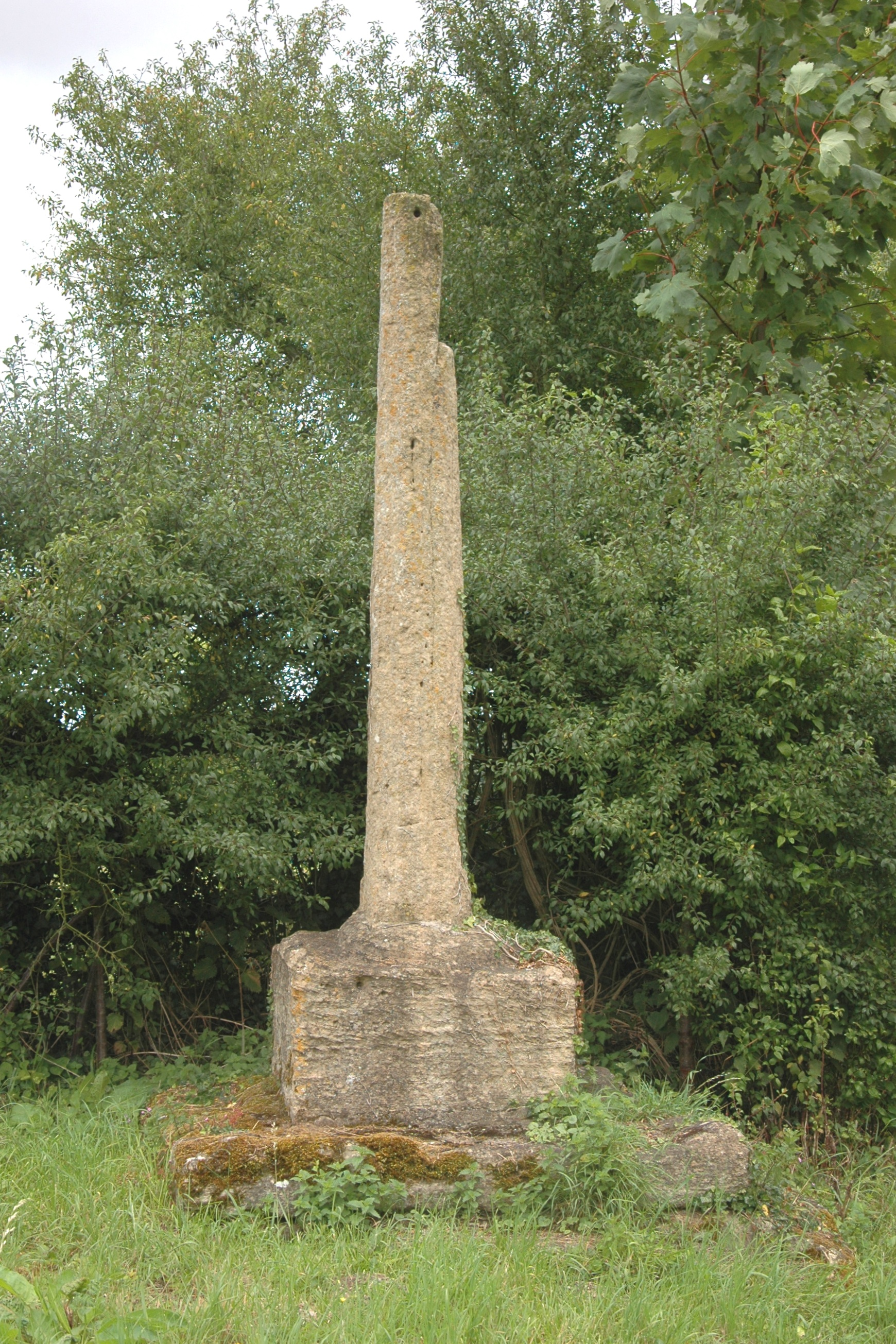
Late medieval preaching cross

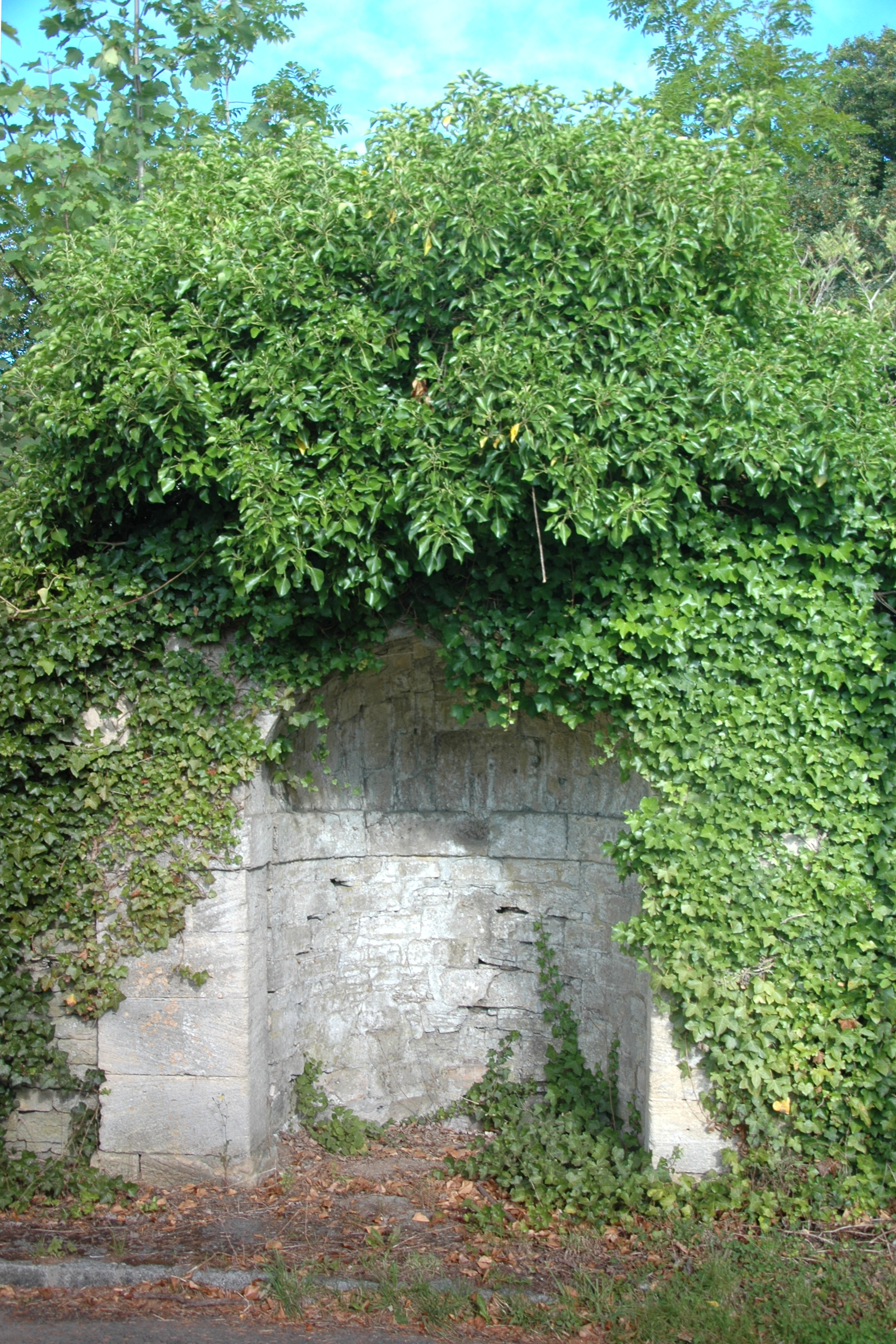
Stone niche with semicircular top, on road between preaching cross and former post office

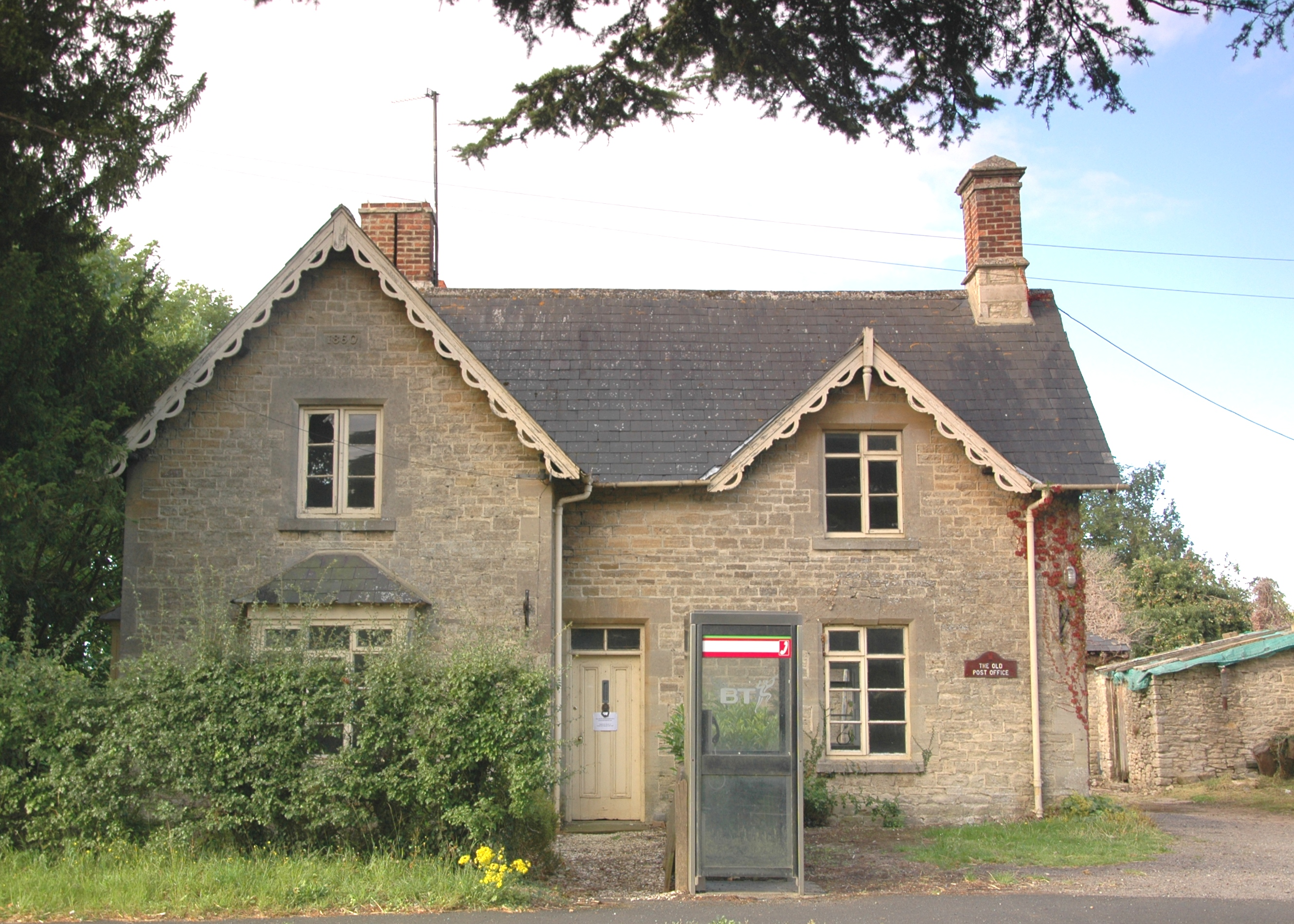
Former post office

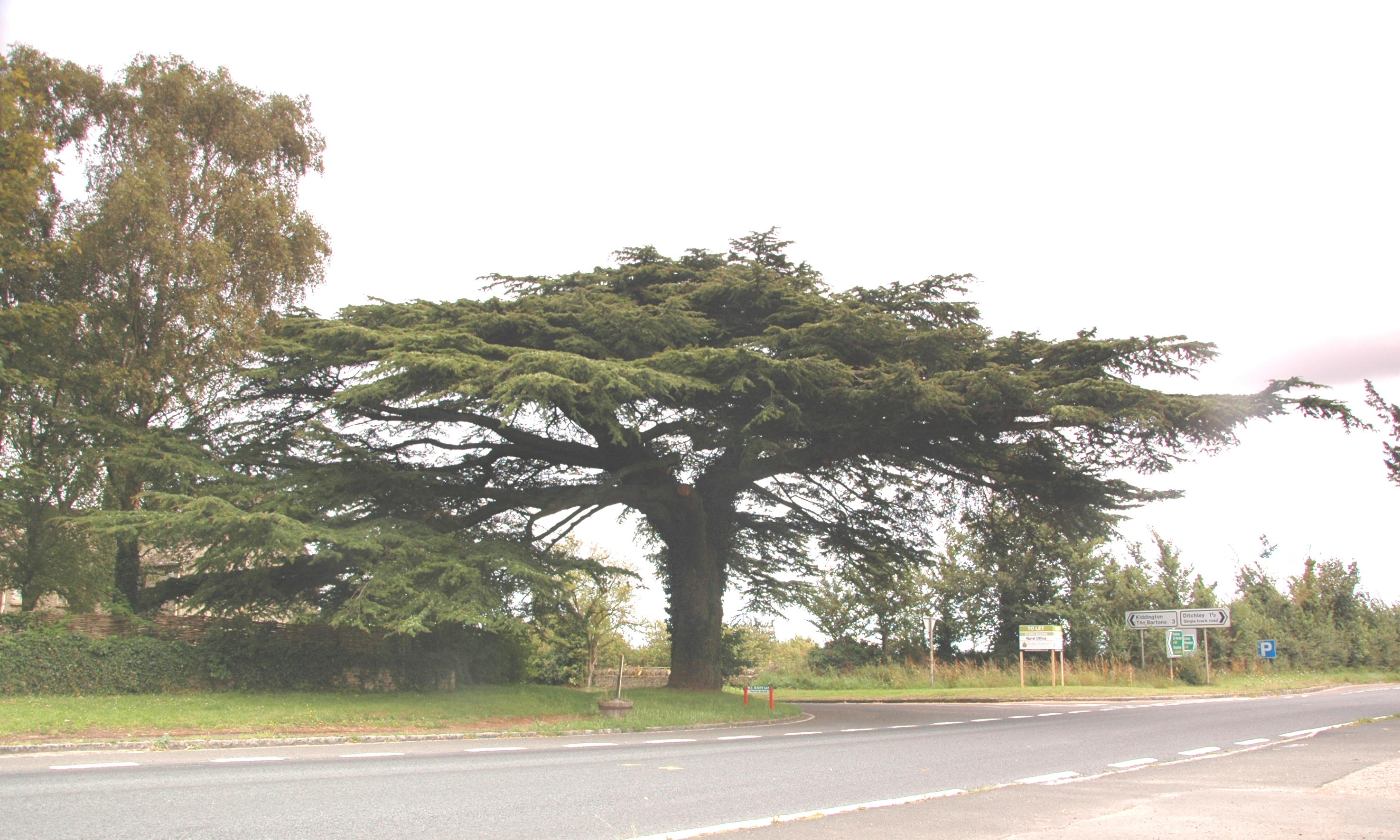
Cedar tree at the crossroads with the A44
