= RSM UK =

British professional services firm

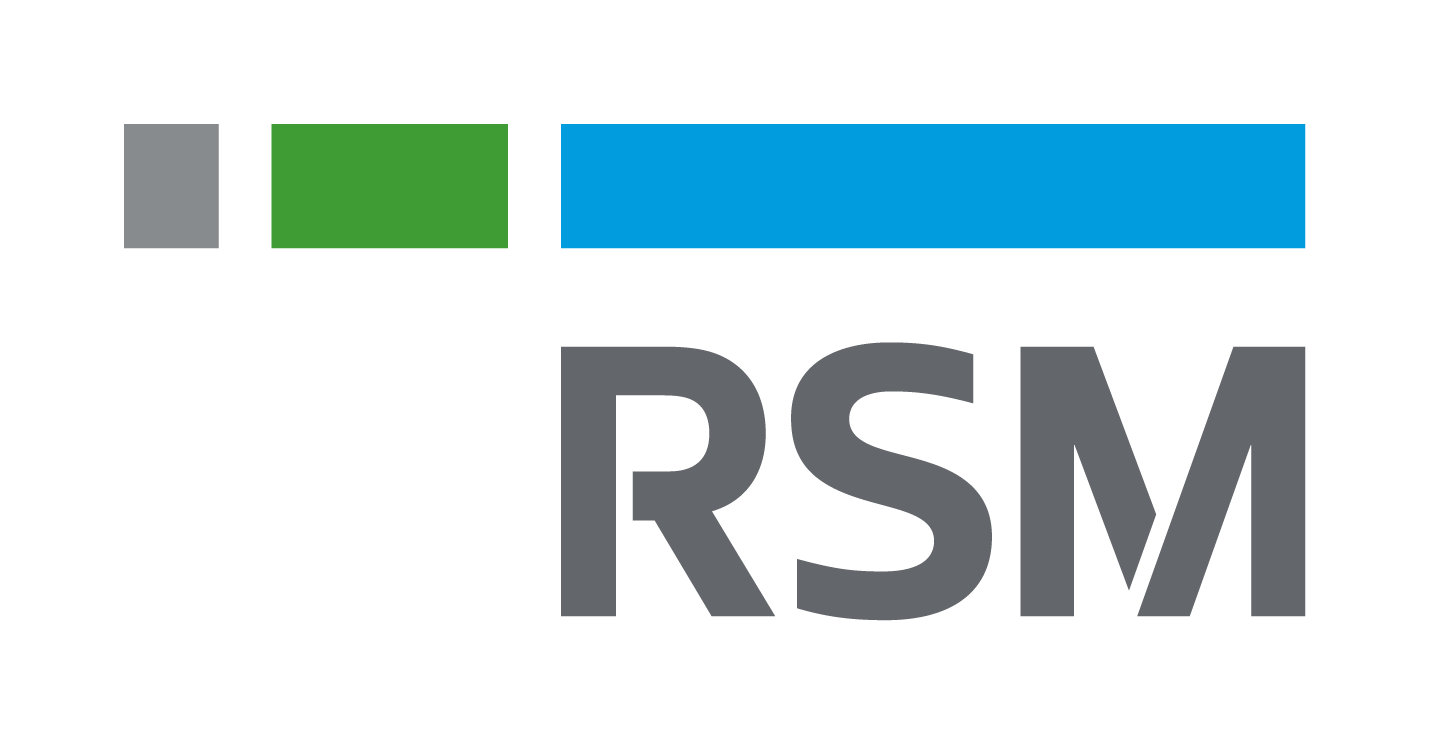

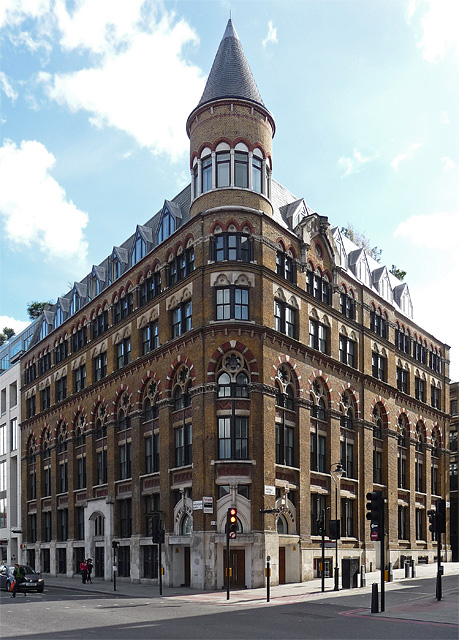
- Headquarters at 25 Farringdon Road, London
- Company type: Accounting firm
- Industry: Accounting
- Headquarters: London, United Kingdom
- Key people: Rob Donaldson (CEO)
- Products: Audit & Assurance; Business Consulting; Outsourcing; Restructuring; Risk Advisory; Tax; Corporate Finance
- Website: www.rsmuk.com

RSM UK is a provider of audit, tax, and consulting services to middle-market businesses. It is the seventh-largest business advisory firm in the United Kingdom and the sixth-largest globally.

The firm offers audit and assurance, risk advisory, outsourcing, tax, consulting, restructuring, transactions, and legal services. RSM works with a wide range of public, private, and not for profit companies.

== History ==
The firm was founded in 1865 by Walter Howard. Historical name changes and mergers with many different firms have brought the partnership to where it is today. The name Baker Tilly was created in 1988 through the merger between Howard Tilly and Baker Rooke.

The firm continued to grow through several mergers, including the purchase of the trading subsidiaries of RSM Tenon Group in September 2013. Following the purchase of RSM Tenon in April 2014, Baker Tilly became a member firm of RSM Global having served notice on Baker Tilly International, the international network to which it previously belonged.

The firm changed its name on 26 October 2015, adopting RSM as the common brand name for more than one hundred firms within the RSM International network.
