= Lawrence Robson =

English accountant (1904–1982)

Sir Lawrence Robson FCA
- Robson in 1952

President of the Liberal Party
- In office 1953–1954
- Preceded by: Ronald Walker
- Succeeded by: Henry Graham White

Personal details
- Born: Lawrence William Robson; 8 August 1904 Norton-on-Tees, County Durham, England
- Died: 24 August 1982 (aged 78)

Sir Lawrence William Robson, FCA, (8 August 1904 – 24 August 1982) was a British accountant and Liberal Party activist.

Born in Norton-on-Tees, Robson studied at Stockton Grammar School and the Royal Academy of Music before becoming an accountant. In 1927, he was a founder of Robson, Rhodes & Company, remaining a partner until 1975.

In 1940, Robson married Inga-Stina Arvidsson, a Swedish woman, and this led to him becoming active in the Anglo-Swedish Society. From 1949 to 1969, he served on the council of the Institute of Chartered Accountants in England and Wales. He also served on the Herbert Committee's inquiry into the electricity industry, and chaired the Britain in Europe Committee, then later served on the council of the European Movement.

Robson was also active in the Liberal Party. He stood unsuccessfully in Banbury at the 1950 and 1951 general elections, and served as its President in 1953/4. Inga-Stina later held the same post.

In 1950, Robson moved into Kiddington Hall. In later life, he used his money and organisational skills to save the National Liberal Club from closure. In 1981, he was created a Knight Commander of the Order of the Polar Star, and the following year he was knighted in the 1982 Queen's Birthday Honours List.

Party political offices
Preceded by Ronald Walker	President of the Liberal Party; 1953–1954	Succeeded by Henry Graham White
