= Accountancy Age =

Online trade publication

- Editor: Michael McCaw
- Former editors: Austin Clark, Emma Smith, Gavin Hinks, Beth McLoughlin, Damian Wild
- Staff writers: Tom Lemmon, Chris Jewers, Shannon Moyer, Leanna Reeves, Jeremy Chan
- Categories: Accountancy, finance, tax, systems
- First issue: 1969
- Company: Contentive
- Country: United Kingdom
- Language: English
- Website: www.accountancyage.com
- ISSN: 0001-4672

Accountancy Age is an online trade publication for accountants and financial staff in the United Kingdom. After running from 1969 to 2011 with a circulation of over 60,000 in print, it changed with effect from May 2011 to an online-only publication.

== History ==
Accountancy Age was first published on 5 December 1969, by Michael Heseltine's company Haymarket Publishing. Haymarket later sold Accountancy Age and Computing magazine to become the mainstay journals of VNU Business Publications Ltd, which formed in 1980. The parent company, Dutch media group VNU, was acquired by a group of private equity firms in 2006, and renamed as The Nielsen Company. They then sold the business publications division to venture capital group 3i, which in February 2007 sold the UK company to Incisive Media.

Incisive announced in April 2011 that the last print edition would be dated 21 April 2011.

In 2015, Incisive sold Accountancy Age and Financial Director to Contentive.

== Awards ==
From 1995 to 2010 the magazine organised and hosted The Accountancy Age Awards for accountancy firms, individuals, teams, initiatives and software packages. In 2011 these were succeeded by the British Accountancy Awards.

The magazine has itself won various awards including a top 500 UK "Business Superbrand" in 2007 and the 2008 Award for "Editorial Team of the Year" from the Association of Online Publishers. Liam Saunders' weekly cartoon "Colin" won the Workworld Media Award for "Cartoonist of the Year" in 2003.

== Readership ==
The target audience is British qualified accountants. The AOP's editorial award case study refers to "senior figures at big four firms and in government swearing by the team's newswires, live blogs, and multimedia industry coverage", and the website claims that it is considered the "independent voice of the profession".
