= RSM US =

Tax, accounting and consulting firm based in Chicago

RSM US LLP
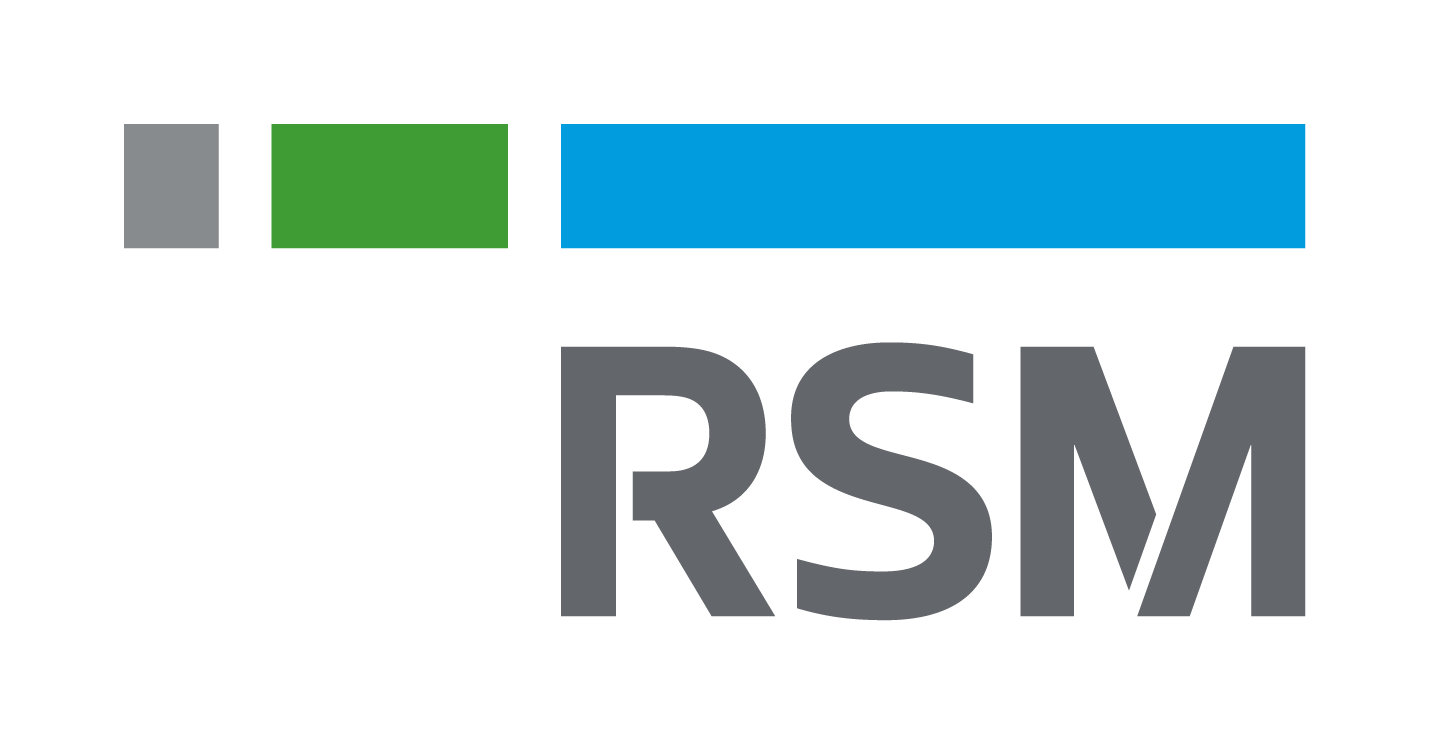
- Type: Limited Liability Partnership
- Industry: Professional services
- Founded: 1926; 100 years ago (as IB McGladrey Company)
- Founder: Ira B. McGladrey
- Headquarters: 30 South Wacker, Chicago, Illinois, U.S.
- Number of locations: 77 in the United States (2025); 6 in Canada (2025); 4 in India (2025); 1 in El Salvador (2025)
- Area served: United States, Canada, India, El Salvador (2025)
- Key people: Brian Becker (CEO); Sam Mascareno (COO); Joseph Taiano (CMO); Jiten Shah (CFO); Sergio de la Fe (Digital Leader); Tyrone Beasley (CTO)
- Services: Audit; Tax; Management consulting Risk advisory Technology consulting Financial advisory Legal
- Revenue: ▲$4 billion USD (2025)
- Number of employees: 20,000+ (2025)
- Parent: RSM International
- Website: rsmus.com

RSM US LLP is a provider of consulting, tax and assurance services for the middle market. It is part of a transatlantic partnership with the UK, Canada, Mexico and Ireland and has integrated teams in India and El Salvador. As of 2026, Accounting Today ranks RSM as the 5th largest firm in the U.S., with $5 billion in revenues and a staff of over 20,000 people. The firm is a member of the RSM International network, which spans 120 countries around the world.

== History ==
RSM was founded in 1926 by Ira B. McGladrey (1883-1952) in Cedar Rapids, Iowa.

McGladrey became a prominent figure in public accounting in Iowa, serving as President of the Iowa Society of Certified Public Accountants, chairman of the Iowa Board of Accountancy, as well as a member of the Rules Committee of the American Institute of Certified Public Accountants, the premier governing body for the field of accounting in the United States. The firm continued to operate under some variant of the McGladrey name for nearly nine decades, until 2015 when the firm was rebranded as RSM US LLP to alighn with its global network.

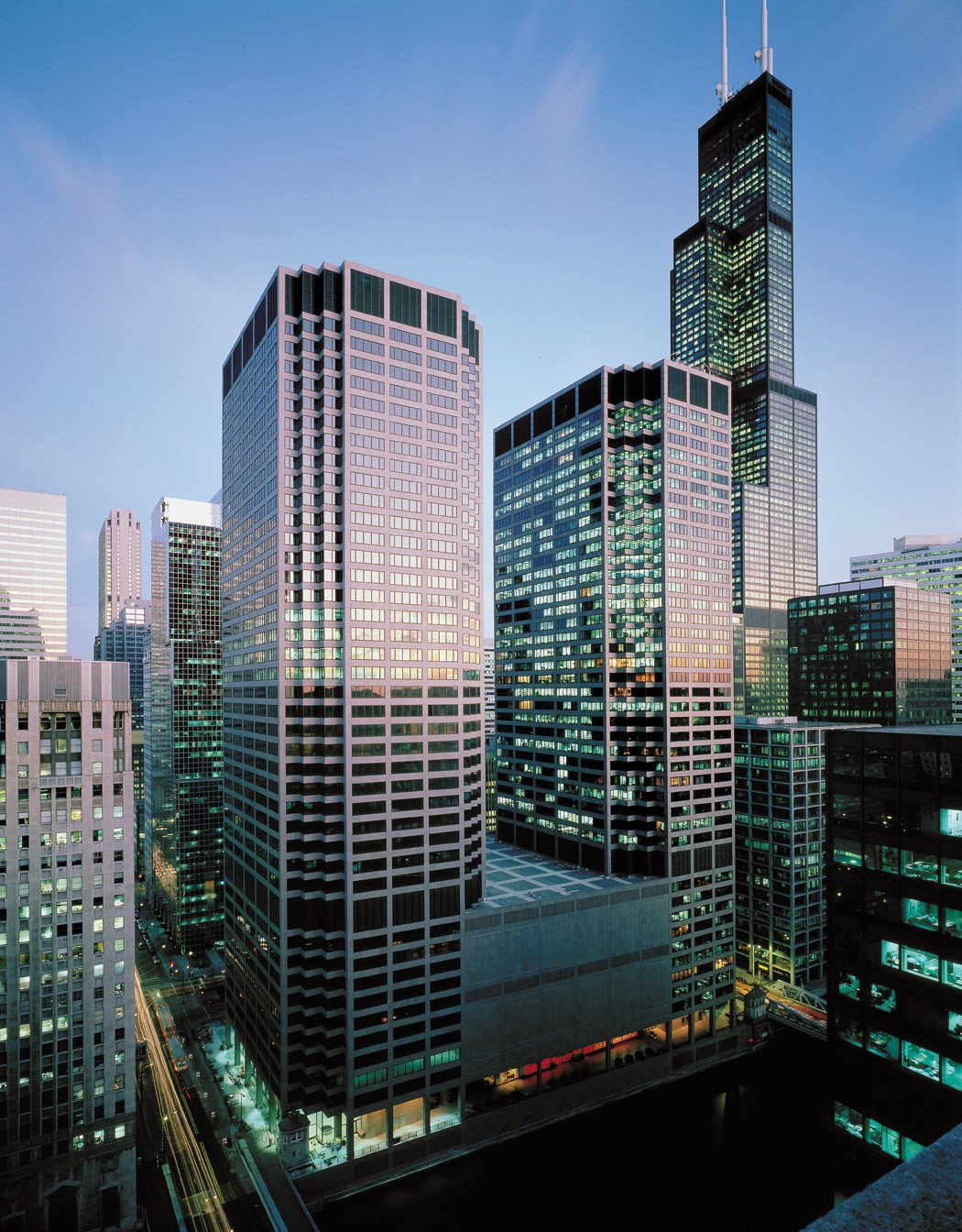
RSM US LLP's headquarters at 30 South Wacker tower of the CME Center.

Beginning in 1999, through a partnership with H&R Block, McGladrey operated under two separate legal entities: McGladrey & Pullen, LLP; and RSM McGladrey, Inc. McGladrey & Pullen operated under the traditional partnership structure and offered audit and attestation services. RSM McGladrey was established under the partnership agreement with H&R Block to provide tax and advisory services under an alternative practice structure.

In August 2011, H&R Block announced the conclusion of the partnership, divesting RSM McGladrey to McGladrey & Pullen and reuniting the firms in their traditional partnership structure. McGladrey & Pullen acquired all employees, assets, and infrastructure from RSM McGladrey. The deal closed on December 1, 2011.

On May 1, 2012, McGladrey & Pullen officially changed its name to McGladrey LLP. In July 2012, McGladrey shifted its headquarters from Bloomington, Minnesota to Chicago.

On October 26, 2015, McGladrey LLP changed its name to RSM US LLP as part of a worldwide rebranding of RSM International members to create a unified global brand.

On January 1, 2026, RSM US LLP joined with RSM Firms in the UK, Canada and Ireland to form a transatlantic partnership designed to improve cross-border services for international clients. The participating firms remained separate legal entities under a centralized governance structure. On June 15, 2026, the firm announced that Mexico would also join the partnership.

=== Legal structure ===
RSM US LLP is a limited liability partnership. It is an independent member of the RSM International network.

== Controversies ==
In 2006, RSM settled a business fraud class action lawsuit against them for $41.5M.

In 2019, RSM was charged with violating auditor independence rules by the SEC. The charges were in connection with more than 100 audit reports involving at least 15 audit clients. RSM agreed to be censured and was fined $950,000.

In June 2020, RSM settled a professional negligence claim brought by Physicians United Plan for $17 million.

In 2022, the SEC charged RSM, two partners and a senior manager with improper conduct charges. RSM agreed to pay $3.75M to resolve the charges. The senior manager was fired over this issue, however both partners remain with RSM.

In the 2024 Public Company Accounting Oversight Board (PCAOB) Inspection Report, the PCAOB gave RSM an audit deficiency rate of 41%.

In 2024, a former employee sued RSM, alleging racial and gender discrimination, a culture of sexual harassment, and violations of her rights under New York law.

== Service lines ==
=== Audit and financial reporting services ===
- Global audit
- Public company Audit
- Private company audit
- Employee plan benefit audit

=== Tax advisory services ===
- Federal tax
- Indirect tax
- State and local tax
- International tax planning strategies
- Credits and incentives
- Tax function optimization

=== Consulting services ===
- Strategy and management consulting
- Information technology consulting
- Financial advisory
  - Valuation services
  - Litigation and dispute advisory
  - Financial investigations
  - Restructuring and bankruptcy
- Risk advisory
- M&A transaction advisory services
- Technical accounting

== Awards and recognition ==
- Accounting Today ranked RSM the fifth largest accounting, tax and consulting services firm in the U.S. in 2025 and 2026.
- Accounting Today ranked RSM No. 1 on their VAR 100 List in 2025 and 2026.
- In 2026, Business Insider named RSM one of on its list of Top Management Consulting Firms in the country.
- Great Place to Work and Fortune named RSM one of the 2025 100 Best Companies to Work For.
- In 2026, Newsweek named RSM one of America's Greatest Workplaces in Professional Services, as well as one of America's Greatest Workplaces for Mental Wellbeing, Women and Culture, Belonging & Community.
- RSM received Handshake's Early Talent Award for the sixth consecutive year in 2026.
- In 2025 and 2026, CRN named RSM to its Solution Provider 500 List as well as its Tech Elite 250 List.
- RSM recognized on the list of America's Best Large Employers by Forbes in 2026 for the fourth consecutive year.
- RSM earned an Equality 100 Award in the Human Rights Campaign Foundation’s 2025 and 2026 Corporate Equality Indexes.
- In 2026, USA Today recognized RSM as one of America's Most Recommended Tax & Accounting Firms.
- People Magazine named RSM to its 2025 PEOPLE’s 100 Companies That Care list.
- RSM was named as a Certified Age-Friendly Employer by Age-Friendly Institute.
- Accounting Today recognized RSM as one of its Best Firms for Technology.

== Sponsorships ==
RSM US LLP is the title sponsor of the RSM Classic, a PGA Tour event that takes place in Sea Island, Georgia in November of each year. The firm also sponsors professional golfers, such as PGA Tour professionals Zach Johnson and Davis Love III, as well as LPGA professional golfers Maria Fassi and Megan Khang.
