= RSM International =

Multinational network of accounting firms

RSM International Limited
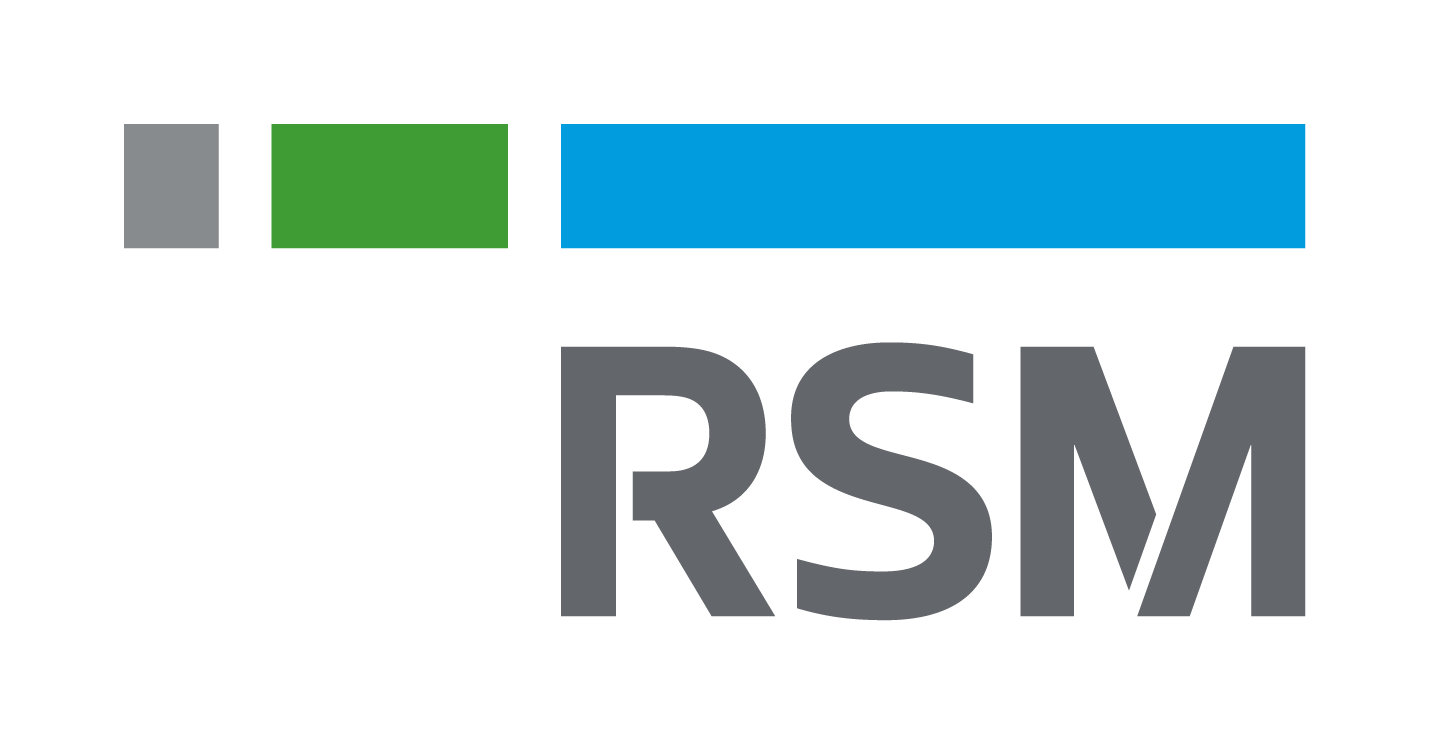
- Company type: Member firms have different legal structures United States and United Kingdom: Limited Liability Partnership
- Industry: Professional services
- Founded: 1964
- Headquarters: London, United Kingdom
- Area served: Worldwide
- Key people: Jean Stephens, CEO & Ernest John Nedder, CEO Elect
- Services: Assurance; Tax advisory Management consulting Financial advisory Risk advisory
- Revenue: ▲US$9.4 billion (2023)
- Number of employees: 64,000
- Divisions: Audit; Tax; Consulting
- Website: rsm.global

RSM International, branded RSM since 2015, is a multinational network of accounting firms based in London, United Kingdom. RSM is the sixth-largest accountancy professional services network in the world by revenue. RSM's member firms are independent accounting and advisory businesses, each of which practices in its own right and is unified as part of the network.

The network is administered by RSM International Limited, a company registered in England and Wales,. However, the network itself is not a separate legal entity and does not provide services. The largest member firms are RSM US, formerly known as McGladrey, and RSM UK, formerly Baker Tilly LLP.

== History ==
RSM International was founded in 1964 as a small network called DRM (Dunwoody, Robson Rhodes, and McGladrey & Pullen). The organisation restructured in 1993, changing its name to RSM International. The word International was dropped in 2015.

Historically, RSM was derived from the initials of three of the original founding member firms of the organization:

- Robson Rhodes (United Kingdom)
- Salustro Reydel (France)
- McGladrey (United States)

Founding member Robson Rhodes was acquired by Grant Thornton and absorbed within its network, while Salustro Reydel merged with KPMG. McGladrey, the member firm of RSM US, is still part of the network today.

In January 2006, Jean Stephens became the first female chief executive officer of an international accounting network in the Top 10.

In April 2024, it was announced that Ernest John Nedder would become CEO on 1 June 2024

== See also ==
- Professional services networks
- Accounting networks and associations
