= RSM Robson Rhodes =

RSM Robson Rhodes LLP
- Industry: Accounting
- Founded: 1927; 98 years ago
- Founder: Lawrence Robson
- Defunct: 2007
- Fate: Operations merged into parent Grant Thornton
- Parent: RSM Global (before 2007); Grant Thornton (after 2007)

RSM Robson Rhodes LLP was a partnership of chartered accountants in the United Kingdom and Ireland. It was the UK member firm of RSM Global, the 6th largest network of professional accountancy firms in the world. With offices throughout the UK and Ireland, the firm offered auditing, consultancy and tax services to a wide variety of organisations in the private and public sectors.

Robson Rhodes was the 12th largest accountancy firm in the UK, with revenues of £85.5 million for the year ending 30 April 2006, and average revenue per partner of £1.007 million. However, despite the size of its turnover the firm was loss-making (£3.8m loss in 2006), and heavily in debt (£45m including partner debts). It became a part of Grant Thornton on 1 July 2007.

Robson Rhodes was founded in 1927 by Sir Lawrence Robson.

== Mergers ==
In 2006, RSM Robson Rhodes announced that it was to merge with the US firm of RSM International, RSM McGladrey. However, delays in completing the deal due to financial problems at H&R Block, the company which owned RSM McGladrey, led Robson Rhodes to terminate the deal. Prior to this, the company had sought other mergers including unsuccessful talks with the UK arm of Mazars.

On 29 April 2007, the partners of Robson Rhodes announced that they were to merge with Grant Thornton UK LLP, the UK firm of Grant Thornton International, then the sixth largest accountancy firm in the United Kingdom. The merged entity uses the Grant Thornton brand and Robson Rhodes no longer exists as a separate name. The deal was completed on 1 July 2007.

== Locations ==
RSM Robson Rhodes had 10 offices in the UK and Ireland:

- Belfast
- Birmingham
- Bristol
- Cambridge
- Dublin
- Edinburgh
- Hemel Hempstead
- Leeds
- London (Head Office)
- Manchester

Following the merger with Grant Thornton, the Dublin office transferred to Grant Thornton Ireland.

Many of the offices have now been closed and merged with Grant Thornton offices. The exception has been the London head office in Finsbury Square and the Hemel Hempstead office.
