= Chief audit executive =

Person responsible for internal audit

The chief audit executive (CAE), director of audit, director of internal audit, auditor general, or controller general is a high-level independent corporate executive with overall responsibility for internal audit.

Publicly traded corporations typically have an internal audit department, led by a chief audit executive ("CAE") who reports functionally to the audit committee of the board of directors, with administrative reporting to the chief executive officer.

The profession is unregulated, though there are a number of international standard setting bodies, an example of which is the Institute of Internal Auditors ("IIA"). The IIA has established Standards for the Professional Practice of Internal Auditing and has over 150,000 members representing 165 countries, including approximately 65,000 Certified Internal Auditors.

The CAE is intrinsically an independent function; otherwise it may become dysfunctional and of low quality (but there are many degrees in the level of independence and efficiency). The CAE function exists only to constitute a third-level of control in the organisation, which must be independent from the first-level control (the first-level layer belongs to the management of an organisation, who is responsible in the first instance for acting in compliance with the organisation's rules) and consecutively second-level (which are the supporting units i.e. legal, HR, risk function, financial control etc.). An effective independence is the result of both an attitude of CAE, and of prerogatives/guarantees conceded by the organisation or given by the organisation's principals (e.g., the board of directors or audit committee).

Because the CAE understands risks and controls, company strategy and the regulatory environment the CAE may assume additional organizational responsibilities beyond traditional internal auditing.

== Independent attitude ==
The CAE should be independent in the performance of their duties, so that they can carry out their work freely without admitting interference, and as objectively as possible. Independence permits them to render impartial and unbiased judgements, which are essential to the proper evaluation of management and controls. It also allows them to view the financial actions, procedures and decisions in a detached way. This may become of an importance when providing objective assurance about the internal control framework.

== Organizational independence ==
To perform their role effectively, CAEs require organizational independence from management, to enable unrestricted evaluation of management activities and personnel. This can be analysed in the different points below:

- (for a different analysis of independence, see organizational independence analysed by the IIA)

All the elements below should be granted to the CAE in the basic rules of the organisation, or stated in the charter of audit approved by the audit committee and promulgated in the organization (IIA Standard 1110 Organizational Independence, and standard 1000C1).

=== Independent function: no conflict of interest allowed ===
Even though the CAE may be formally part of the management structure of the organisation (among the “chief executives”), they do not participate in any management decision process or accept any responsibility in the execution of company activities.

CAEs may advise management (must, when it is about compliance, risk management, internal controls...) and the board of directors (or similar oversight body) regarding how to better execute their responsibilities. But they remain independent of the activities observes or audits.

=== Hierarchical independence ===
The primary customer of internal audit activity is the entity charged with oversight of management's activities. This is typically the audit committee, a sub-committee of the board of directors. To provide hierarchical independence, most chief audit executives report to the chairperson of the audit committee as to the performance of his/her duties.

The definition (and regular revision) of the scope of the function should be agreed between the CAE and the audit committee. The internal audit's annual work plan, which for practical reasons must be discussed with the auditees, is subject to the approbation of the sole audit committee, board of directors, or other appropriate governing authority (IIA Standard 1110 Organizational Independence).

The internal rules and practices of the directorate of internal audit (audit manual) are of the responsibility of the CAE.

=== Independent status ===
The independence of the CAE in the performance of his duties should be guaranteed in the staff rules. The audit committee should have sole competence for the final decision on appointment and dismissal of the CAE”, and for his remuneration, activity appraisal and career advancement.

The CAE is liable to disciplinary action but only with the concurrence of the audit committee. This could happen if they are negligent in the performance of their duties.

=== Independent communication right ===
The CAE reports directly to the audit committee and the board. There should be a report from the CAE to each ordinary audit committee meeting and if deemed necessary to the board. Such reports should be addressed directly to the chairman of the audit committee with parallel copy to the director-general.

However, the CAE in the performance of his daily work communicates and liaises with the director-general and the staff of the organisation.

=== Independent budgeting ===
Although CAEs and internal auditors are paid by the company, the human resource budget of the directorate of internal audit, in particular, should be protected from interference from the audited organisation. The typical risk is that the audit's budget subject to the approval of director of HR and of the DG is a source of potential interference or friendly pressure to self-limit the CAE's critic exercise of an independent viewpoint. An appeal to the board, even expressly foreseen as part of the communication right of the CAE, is often ineffective on short-term imposed constraints, given the time constraints of the budget process. The best practice is that the audit committee's opinion is required on the CAE's draft budget, well in advance of the normal budgeting process of the organisation.

=== Access to information ===
Information is of key importance to organize, prepare and perform internal audits. Independent auditors are generally granted full access to any and all information they require to discharge their responsibilities. Reasonable restrictions would be limited to things such as personal information in personnel records such as health information. Unduly restricted access to information is a major impediment to an independent auditor and indicates that an organization is not truly supportive of the auditor's mandate and its commitment to sound governance should be questioned.

== Typical duties ==
=== Status, strategy and organisation of the internal audit department ===
- Ensure that the status (e.g. stipulated in an audit charter), strategy, resources of the internal audit department are aligned and are consistent with the organization's objectives and governance policy.
- Establish appropriate policies and procedures to guide the internal audit function, and ensure the quality of the assurance services delivered.

=== Management, supervision of the internal audit activity ===
- Obtain (or manage the production of) a risk analysis;
  - Ensure that the risk assessment is done at least annually;
  - Establish risk-based audit plans to set out the priorities of the internal audit function, consistent with the organizational objectives.
- Considers the input of senior management, senior departmental management, of the audit committee;
- The internal audit plan usually addresses financial reporting and other fundamental controls, to be coordinated with the audit plan of the statutory auditor
- Coordinate internal auditing activities and plans with other internal and external providers of assurance and consulting activities to ensure proper coverage and minimize duplication of effort.
- Communicate plan of engagements and resource requirements for the internal audit function, including significant interim changes to the audit committee. This communication shall include the impact of resource limitations.
- Ensure that internal audit resources are appropriate, sufficient and effectively deployed to achieve the internal audit plan approved by the audit committee or the board.

Ensure that internal auditors have appropriate professional qualifications and skills, and opportunities for sufficient training and development to maintain and develop their internal auditing competence and to obtain Certified Internal Auditor certification.

- Ensure the timely completion of internal auditing engagements.
- Ensure that reports on internal auditing engagements are provided to the audit committee with a minimum of delay.
- Provide an annual holistic opinion on the effectiveness and adequacy of risk management, control, and governance processes.

=== Quality management ===
The CAE is responsible for assuring that appropriate engagement supervision is provided. Supervision is a process begins with planning and continues throughout the examination, evaluation, communication, and follow-up phases of the engagement.

- Develop and maintain a quality assurance and improvement program that covers all aspects of the internal audit function, and continuously monitor its effectiveness.
- In collaboration with the audit committee, ensure that a practice inspection or other external review of the internal audit function is conducted at least every 3 years, by a qualified, independent external review team, and that the results of this external assessment are communicated to the audit committee.
- Ensure that professional internal auditing standards are followed (e.g. IIA standards or local standards).

NB: Generally accepted auditing standards and International Standards on Auditing are external audit standards.

- Report at least annually to the audit committee on the internal audit function's conformance with professional internal auditing standards.

=== Reporting of critical findings ===
Inform the Audit Committee without delay of any issue of risk, control or management practice that may be of significance. The chief audit executive (CAE) reports the most critical issues to the audit committee quarterly, along with management's progress towards resolving them. Critical issues typically have a reasonable likelihood of causing substantial financial or reputational damage to the company. For particularly complex issues, the responsible manager may participate in the discussion. Such reporting is critical to ensure the function is respected, that the proper "tone at the top" exists in the organization, and to expedite resolution of such issues. It is a matter of considerable judgement to select appropriate issues for the audit committee's attention and to describe them in the proper context.

== Survey results ==
Various consulting and public accounting firms perform research on audit committees, to provide benchmarking data. Some results are identified below:

- 54% of committee members surveyed felt the audit committee was "very effective," while 38% indicated "somewhat effective."
- Risk management, internal control, and accounting estimates and judgments were the top priority areas for 2007.
- 41% were "very satisfied" with the internal audit function, while 52% were "somewhat satisfied."
- Two-thirds felt the chief internal audit position was for a professional internal auditor, rather than as a "stepping stone" to other roles.

== See also ==
- Comptroller
- Lead auditor
- Control
- COSO framework
- Audit risk
- Financial audit
- Information technology audit
- Internal audit
- Institute of Internal Auditors
- Corporate governance
- ISA 310 Knowledge of the Business

External audit

- Certified Public Accountant (CPA)
- External auditor
- Statutory auditor
- Auditor general
- International Organization of Supreme Audit Institutions
