= Lead auditor =

Most publicly traded corporations typically have an internal auditing department, led by a chief audit executive ("CAE"), with lead internal auditors managing small teams of internal auditors for one audit engagement. Lead auditor is a position between senior auditor and head of division.

In public accounting firms, a lead auditor for an audit engagement is usually chosen from among the senior auditors.

== Certified lead auditor ==
The certified lead auditor designation is a professional certification for audit team leaders working for certification bodies or performing supplier audits for large organizations. Lead auditor certification requires tertiary education plus two years of work experience as an auditor or lead auditor in training.

== Certification programs ==
It is possible to become a certified lead auditor in the following ISO (International Organization for Standardization) certification programs:

- Quality (ISO 9000)
- Aerospace (AS9100)
- Medical (ISO 13485)
- Environmental audits (ISO 14001)
- Information security (ISO/IEC 27001)
- Occupational health and safety (ISO 45001)
- Diversity and Inclusion (ISO/CD 30415 Diversity and inclusion) ISO Diversity

== See also ==
- ISO 27001 Lead Auditor
- Chief audit executive, Director of Audit (disambiguation)
- Comptroller General of the United States, Comptroller, Comptroller General (disambiguation)
- Certified Public Accountant (CPA), External auditor
- COSO framework
- Financial audit
- Continuous auditing
- Audit risk
- Green Globe
- Information technology audit
- ISO/CD 30415 Diversity and inclusion https://www.iso.org/standard/71164.html
