= Audit =

Independent examination of an organization

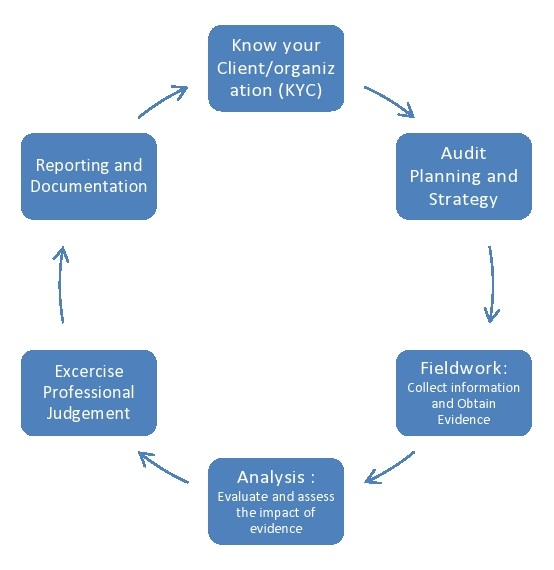
Some typical stages in the audit process

An audit is an "independent examination of financial information of any entity, whether profit-oriented or not, irrespective of its size or legal form, when such an examination is conducted with a view to express an opinion thereon." Auditing also attempts to ensure that the books of accounts are properly maintained by such entities as required by law. Auditors consider the propositions before them, obtain evidence, document their findings, and evaluate the propositions in their auditing report.

Audits provide third-party assurance to various stakeholders that the subject is free from material misstatement. The term is most frequently applied to audits of the financial information relating to a legal person. Other commonly audited areas include secretarial and compliance, internal controls, quality management, project management, water management, and energy conservation. As a result of an audit, stakeholders may evaluate and improve the effectiveness of risk management, control, and governance over the subject.

Lately, auditing has expanded to encompass many areas of public and corporate life. Professor Michael Power refers to this extension of auditing practices as the “Audit Society”.

Optimal auditing is a research field in economic theory and computer science that considers that auditing is costly and aims to construct auditing policies that are optimal for the principal.

== Etymology ==
The word “audit” derives from the Latin word audire which means “to hear”.

== History ==
Auditing has been a safeguard measure since ancient times. During medieval times, when manual bookkeeping was prevalent, auditors in Britain used to hear the accounts read out for them and checked that the organization's personnel were not negligent or fraudulent. In 1951, Moyer identified that the most important duty of the auditor was to detect fraud. Chatfield documented that early United States auditing was viewed mainly as verification of bookkeeping detail.

== Information technology audit ==
An information technology audit, or information systems audit, is an examination of the management controls within an Information technology (IT) infrastructure. The evaluation of obtained evidence determines if the information systems are safeguarding assets, maintaining data integrity, and operating effectively to achieve the organization's goals or objectives. These reviews may be performed with a financial statement audit, internal audit, or other form of attestation engagement.

== Accounting ==
Due to strong incentives (including taxation, misselling and other forms of fraud) to misstate financial information, auditing has become a legal requirement for many entities that have the power to exploit financial information for personal gain. Traditionally, audits were mainly associated with gaining information about financial systems and the financial records of a company or a business. Financial audits also assess whether a business or corporation adheres to legal duties as well as other applicable statutory customs and regulations.

Financial audits are performed to ascertain the validity and reliability of information, as well as to provide an assessment of a system's internal control. The third-party auditor will express an opinion of the person, organization, or system in question. The opinion given on financial statements will depend on the audit evidence obtained.

A statutory audit is a legally required review of the accuracy of a company's or government's financial statements and records. The purpose of a statutory audit is to determine whether an organization provides a fair and accurate representation of its financial position by examining information such as bank balances, bookkeeping records, and financial transactions.

Due to constraints, an audit seeks to provide only reasonable assurance that the statements are free from material error. Hence, statistical sampling is often adopted in audits. In the case of financial audits, a set of financial statements are said to be true and fair when they are free of material misstatements—a concept influenced by both quantitative (numerical) and qualitative factors. Recently, the argument that auditing should go beyond just true and fair is gaining momentum, and the US Public Company Accounting Oversight Board has come out with a concept release on the same.

Cost accounting is a process for verifying the cost of manufacturing or producing any article, based on accounts measuring the use of material, labor, or other costs. The term “cost audit” refers to a systematic and accurate verification of the cost accounts and records and checking for adherence to the cost accounting objectives. According to the Institute of Cost and Management Accountants, a cost audit is “an examination of cost accounting records and verification of facts to ascertain that the cost of the product has been arrived at, in accordance with principles of cost accounting.”

In most countries, an audit must adhere to generally accepted standards established by governing bodies. These standards assure third parties or external users that they can rely upon the auditor's opinion on the fairness of financial statements or other subjects on which the auditor expresses an opinion. The audit must therefore be precise and accurate, containing no additional misstatements or errors.

=== Integrated audits ===
In the US, audits of publicly traded companies are governed by rules laid down by the Public Company Accounting Oversight Board (PCAOB), which was established by Section 404 of the Sarbanes–Oxley Act of 2002. Such an audit is called an integrated audit, where auditors, in addition to an opinion on the financial statements, must also express an opinion on the effectiveness of a company's internal control over financial reporting, in accordance with PCAOB Auditing Standard No. 5.

New types of integrated auditing are becoming available; they use unified compliance material (see the unified compliance section in Regulatory compliance). Due to the increasing number of regulations and need for operational transparency, organizations are adopting risk-based audits that can cover multiple regulations and standards from a single audit event. This is a new approach in some sectors to ensure that all the governance requirements are met without duplicating effort from both audit and audit hosting resources.

=== Assessments ===
The purpose of an assessment is to measure something or calculate a value for it. An auditor's objective is to determine whether financial statements are presented fairly, in all material respects, and are free of material misstatement. Although the process of producing an assessment may involve an audit by an independent professional, its purpose is to provide a measurement rather than to express an opinion about the fairness of statements or quality of performance.

=== Auditors ===
Auditors of financial statements & non-financial information (including compliance audits) can be classified into various categories:

- An external auditor or statutory auditor is an independent firm engaged by the client subject to the audit to express an opinion on whether the company's financial statements are free of material misstatements, whether due to fraud or error. For publicly traded companies, external auditors may also be required to express an opinion on the effectiveness of internal controls over financial reporting. External auditors may also be engaged to perform other agreed-upon procedures, related or unrelated to financial statements. Most importantly, external auditors, though engaged and paid by the company being audited, should be regarded as independent and have the status of a third party.
- A cost auditor or statutory cost auditor is an independent firm engaged by the client subject to the cost audit to express an opinion on whether the company's cost statements and cost sheet are free of material misstatements, whether due to fraud or error. For publicly traded companies, external auditors may also be required to express an opinion on the effectiveness of internal controls over cost reporting. These specialized auditors are called cost accountants in India and globally, either cost and management accountants or certified management accountants or certified professional accountants.
- Government auditors review the finances and practices of government bodies. In the United States, these auditors report their finds to Congress, which uses them to create and manage policies and budgets. Government auditors work for the U.S. Government Accountability Office, and most state governments have similar departments to audit state and municipal agencies.
- A secretarial auditor or statutory secretarial auditor is an independent firm engaged by a client subject to an audit of its compliance with secretarial and other applicable laws to express an opinion on whether the company's secretarial records and compliance of applicable laws are free of material misstatements, whether due to fraud or error, as these invite heavy fines or penalties. For bigger public companies, external secretarial auditors may also be required to express an opinion on the effectiveness of internal controls over the client's compliance system management. In India, these auditors are called company secretaries and are members of the Institute of Company Secretaries of India, holding a Certificate of Practice. (http://www.icsi.edu/)
- Internal auditors are employed by the organizations they audit. They work for government agencies (federal, state, and local); for publicly traded companies; and for non-profit companies across all industries. The internationally recognized standard-setting body for the profession is the Institute of Internal Auditors (IIA). The IIA has defined internal auditing as follows: “Internal auditing is an independent, objective assurance and consulting activity designed to add value and improve an organization's operations. It helps an organization accomplish its objectives by bringing a systematic, disciplined approach to evaluate and improve the effectiveness of risk management, control, and governance processes”. Thus professional internal auditors provide independent and objective audit and consulting services focused on evaluating whether the board of directors, shareholders, stakeholders, and corporate executives have reasonable assurance that the organization's governance, risk management, and control processes are designed adequately and function effectively. Internal audit professionals (Certified Internal Auditors: CIAs) are governed by the international professional standards and code of conduct of the Institute of Internal Auditors. While internal auditors are not independent of the companies that employ them, independence and objectivity are a cornerstone of the IIA professional standards and are discussed at length in the standards and the supporting practice guides and practice advisories. Professional internal auditors are mandated by IIA standards to be independent of the business activities they audit. This independence and objectivity are achieved through the organizational placement and reporting lines of the internal audit department. Internal auditors of publicly traded companies in the United States are required to report functionally to the board of directors directly, or a subcommittee of the board of directors (typically the audit committee), and not to management except for administrative purposes. They follow standards described in the professional literature for the practice of internal auditing (such as Internal Auditor, the journal of the IIA), or other similar and generally recognized frameworks for management control when evaluating an entity's governance and control practices; and apply COSO's “Enterprise Risk Management-Integrated Framework” or other similar and generally recognized frameworks for entity-wide risk management when evaluating an organization's entity-wide risk management practices. Professional internal auditors also use control self-assessment (CSA) as an effective process for performing their work.
- Consultant auditors are external personnel contracted by a client to perform an audit following the client's auditing standards. This differs from the external auditor, who follows their own auditing standards. The level of independence is therefore somewhere between the internal auditor and the external auditor. The consultant auditor may work independently or as part of an audit team that includes internal auditors. Consultant auditors are used when the firm lacks sufficient expertise to audit certain areas or simply for staff augmentation when staff are not available.

The most commonly used external audit standards are the US GAAS of the American Institute of Certified Public Accountants and the International Standards on Auditing (ISA) developed by the International Auditing and Assurance Standard.

=== Technological developments ===
Recent advances in artificial intelligence and automation are reshaping audit practice. Audit firms now apply data analytics and machine-learning techniques to analyze entire datasets instead of statistical samples, improving anomaly detection and efficiency. However, these technologies also introduce challenges related to data quality, algorithmic bias, and the need for professional judgment.

== Performance audits ==
A performance audit is an independent examination of a program, function, operation, or the management systems and procedures of a governmental or non-profit entity to assess whether the entity is achieving economy, efficiency, and effectiveness in the employment of available resources. Safety, security, information systems performance, and environmental concerns are increasingly the subject of audits. There are now audit professionals who specialize in security audits and information systems audits. With nonprofit organizations and government agencies, there has been an increasing need for performance audits, examining their success in satisfying mission objectives.

== Quality audits ==
Quality audits are performed to verify conformance to standards through reviewing objective evidence. A system of quality audits may verify the effectiveness of a quality management system. This is part of certifications such as ISO 9001. Quality audits are essential to verify the existence of objective evidence showing conformance to required processes, to assess how successfully processes have been implemented, and to judge the effectiveness of achieving any defined target levels. Quality audits are also necessary to provide evidence concerning the reduction and elimination of problem areas, and they are a hands-on management tool for achieving continual improvement in an organization.

To benefit the organization, quality auditing should not only report non-conformance and corrective actions but also highlight areas of good practice and provide evidence of conformance. In this way, other departments may share information and amend their working practices as a result, also enhancing continual improvement.

== Project audit ==
A project audit provides an opportunity to uncover issues, concerns, and challenges encountered during the project lifecycle. Conducted midway through the project, a project audit provides the project manager, project sponsor, and project team an interim view of what has gone well, as well as what needs to be improved to successfully complete the project. If done at the close of a project, the audit can be used to develop success criteria for future projects by providing a forensic review. This review identifies which elements of the project were successfully managed and which ones presented challenges. As a result, the review will help the organization identify what it needs to do to avoid repeating the same mistakes on future projects.

Projects can undergo two types of project audits:

- Regular Health Check Audits: The aim of a regular health check audit is to understand the current state of a project to increase project success.
- Regulatory Audits: The aim of a regulatory audit is to verify that a project is compliant with regulations and standards. The best practices of the NEMEA Compliance Centre state that the regulatory audit must be accurate, objective, and independent while providing oversight and assurance to the organization.

Other forms of project audits:

Formal: Applies when the project is in trouble, and the sponsor agrees that the audit is needed, sensitivities are high, and conclusions must be proved via sustainable evidence.

Informal: Applies when a new project manager is provided, there is no indication the project is in trouble, and there is a need to report whether the project is proceeding as planned. Informal audits can apply the same criteria as formal audits, but it is not necessary for the report to be so formal or in-depth.

== Energy audits ==
An energy audit is an inspection, survey, and analysis of energy flows for energy conservation in a building, process, or system to reduce the amount of energy input into the system without negatively affecting the output.

== Operations audit ==
An operations audit is an examination of the operations of the client's business. In this audit, the auditor thoroughly examines the efficiency, effectiveness, and economy of the operations with which the management of the client is achieving its objectives. The operational audit goes beyond internal control issues since management does not achieve its objectives merely by compliance with a satisfactory system of internal controls. Operational audits cover any matters that may be commercially unsound. The objective of an operational audit is to examine three E's, namely: Effectiveness—doing the right things with the least wastage of resources, Efficiency—performing work in the least possible time, and Economy—balance between benefits and costs to run the operation.

A control self-assessment is a commonly used tool for completing an operations audit.

== Forensic audits ==
Also referred to as forensic accountancy, forensic accountant or forensic accounting, a forensic audit is an investigative audit in which accountants specialized in both accounting and investigation seek to uncover fraud, missing money, and negligence.

== See also ==
- Academic audit
- Accounting
- Audit plan
- Big Four accounting firms
- Clinical audit
- Comptroller, Comptroller General, and Comptroller General of the United States
- Continuous auditing
- Cost auditing
- COSO framework, Risk management
- EarthCheck
- Financial audit, External auditor, Certified Public Accountant (CPA), and Audit risk
- Information technology audit, History of information technology auditing, and Information security audit
- Internal audit
- International Organization of Supreme Audit Institutions (INTOSAI)
- Lead auditor, under the chief audit executive or Director of audit
- Mainframe audit
- Management auditing
- Operational auditing
- Optimal auditing
- Peer review
- Quality audit
- Risk-based internal audit
- Supreme audit institution
- SOFT audit
- Technical audit
