= Mohammad Javad Abdolmohammadi =

American professor of accounting

- Born: 1950 (age 75–76); Hamedan, Iran
- Education: Indiana University Bloomington
- Scientific career
- Fields: Accountancy, Internal Audit, Ethics
- Workplaces: The John E. Rhodes Professor of Accounting at Bentley University

Mohammad Javad Abdolmohammadi (Persian: محمد جواد عبدالمحمدی; born 1950) is the John E. Rhodes Professor of Accounting at Bentley University, having held the position since 1988. In 2007, he was inducted into the Northeast Region of the American Accounting Association Hall of Fame (April 28, 2007). He has contributed to more than 100 publications, including many articles and books on internal auditing. He has been the recipient of funding from various granting agencies, including four from The Institute of Internal Auditors Research Foundation (IIARF) CBOK 2010, CBOK 2006, a monograph on "Continuous Internal Auditing" in 2005, and another monograph on "CAE Strategic Relationships" in 2013.

== Education ==
- BA: Accountancy, Tehran College of Insurance, 1974
- MBA: Business Administration, Indiana University Bloomington, 1977
- MA: Economics, Indiana University Bloomington, 1980
- DBA: Business Administration, Indiana University Bloomington, 1982

== Publications ==
Some of books, book chapters, and working papers by Mohammad J. Abdolmohammadi:

=== Books ===
- CAE Strategic Relationships Building Rapport with the Executive Suite, 134 pages, The Institute of Internal Auditors Research Foundation (March 1, 2013), ISBN 978-0894137310;
- Professional Accounting Research and Policy Formulation, Mohammad J. Abdolmohammadi, 309 pages, McGraw Hill (2011), ISBN 978-0390559654.
- A Global Summary of the Common Body of Knowledge 2006, Burnaby, P. A, Abdolmohammadi, M. J, Hass, S., Orlando, FL: The Institute of Internal Auditors Research Foundation (2007).
- Continuous Auditing: An Operational Model for Internal Auditors, Mohammad J. Abdolmohammadi & Ahmad Sharbatouglie, 159 pages, The Institute of Internal Auditors Research Foundation (June 1, 2005), ISBN 978-0894135736;
- Instructor's Resource Guide to accompany Applied Research in Financial Reporting: Text and Cases, Abdolmohammadi, M. J, McQuade, R. J., New York City: McGraw-Hill/Irwin Publishing Co (2002);
- Instructors' Manual for Applied Research in Financial Reporting: Text and Cases, Abdolmohammadi, M. J, McQuade, R. J., New York City: McGraw-Hill/Irwin Publishing Co (2002);
- Applied Research in Financial Reporting: Text and Cases, Mohammad J. Abdolmohammadi, Ralph J McQuade & Ralph McQuade, 336 pages, McGraw-Hill/Irwin (August 3, 2001), ISBN 978-0070004801;
- The Assessment of Task Structure, Knowledge Base, and Decision Aids for a Comprehensive Inventory of Audit Tasks, Catherine A. Usoff & Mohammad J. Abdolmohammadi, 264 pages, Praeger (November 30, 2000), ISBN 978-1567202946; and

=== Book chapters ===
- Entity-Level Control and the Monitoring Role of Corporate Boards, Fletcher Brown, D, Abdolmohammadi, M. J, Thibodeau, J. C., In Corporate Boards: Managers of Risk, Sources of Risk (pp. 199–216), R.W. Kolb, D. Schwartz (Eds.), Boston, MA: Wiley – Blackwell Publishing Ltd (2009);
- A Tool to Measure Ethical Reasoning of IT Professionals and Students, Abdolmohammadi, M. J, Fedorowicz, J., In Encyclopedia of Information Ethics and Security (pp. 440–444), Marian Quigley (Eds.), Hershey, PA: Information Science Reference (2008);
- Auditing, Abdolmohammadi, M. J, Thibodeau, J. C., In Encyclopedia of Business and Finance (pp. 42–45), Burton S. Kaliski (Eds.), New York City: Macmillan (2006).
- Ethics in the Public Accounting Profession, Abdolmohammadi, M. J, Nixon, M. R., In Robert E. Frederick, Edward S. Petry Jr (Eds.), (pp. 164–177). Oxford: Basil Blackwell (1999)

=== Working papers ===
- Availability and cost of audit committee members, 22 pages, Bentley College, Institute for Research and Faculty Development (1991), ASIN: B0006OUKNM;
- Effects of audit risk terminology on task complexity and staffing judgements, 24 pages, Bentley College, Institute for Research and Faculty Development (1991), ASIN: B0006OUKOG;
- A comparative study of the problems facing the accounting profession in Australia and other Anglo-culture countries, 25 pages, Bentley College, Institute for Research and Faculty Development (1991), ASIN: B0006OUKXM;
- Audit committee members' perceptions of responsibility, 21 pages, Institute for Research and Faculty Development (1991), ASIN: B0006OUKYG;
- A model of expert competence: Evidence from auditing, 28 pages, Bentley College (1993), ASIN: B0006P4O1A; and
- Grading policies and student evaluation of accounting faculty: Full-time versus part-time MBA students, 17 pages, Bentley College, Institute for Research and Faculty Development (1989), ASIN: B00071WTB0.
