= Management auditing =

Systematic analysis and assessment of decisions and actions of management

Management audit is a systematic examination of decisions and actions of the management to analyse the performance. Management audit involves the review of managerial aspects like organizational objective, policies, procedures, structure, control and system in order to check the efficiency or performance of the management over the activities of the company. Unlike financial audits, management audit mainly examine the non financial data to audit the efficiency of the management. Audits attempt to search the answer of how well the management has been operating the business of the company. They ask questions like, "Is the managerial style well suited for business operation?". Management Audits focus on results, evaluating the effectiveness and suitability of controls by challenging underlying rules, procedures and methods. In addition, specific focuses of management audits may include Diversity Audits, as has become more common recently.

A management audit is an assessment of methods and policies of an organization's management in the administration and the use of resources, tactical and strategic planning, and employee and organizational improvement. A management audit is generally conducted by the employee of the company or by the independent consultant and focused on the critical evaluation of management as a team rather than appraisal of individual.

== Objectives ==
1. Establishing the current level of effectiveness
2. Suggest improvement
3. Lay down standards for future performance
4. Increased levels of service quality and performance
5. Guidelines for organizational restructuring
6. Introduction of management information systems to assist in meeting productivity and effectiveness goals
7. Better use of resources due to program improvements.
8. To identify the weaknesses and inefficiencies of management in different functional areas, such as production, sales, finance etc.
9. To analyses the different ways to overcome the inefficiencies, or weaknesses.
10. To critically review the organization structure.
11. Evaluate the ways for improving the management efficiency and to select the best
12. It helps the management providing suggestions to attain goal of an organization
13. It ensure sound objective

== Audit procedures ==
Generally auditor deploy following audit procedures to conduct the management audit.

1. Questionnaire
2. Interview with employee and managers
3. Analyzing MIS and internal Business reports
4. Checking quality of business and its impact on P & L

== See also ==
- Audit
- Internal audit
- Risk-based auditing
