= ISA 310 Knowledge of the Business =

ISA 310 Knowledge of the Business was one of the International Standards on Auditing. It is no longer effective with the introduction of ISA 315 'Identifying and assessing the risks of material misstatement through understanding the entity and its environment' and ISA 330 'The auditor's responses to assessed risks'.

It served to expect the auditors are to have necessary knowledge of the client's business. Even before accepting the audit job, auditor has to make sure if you have sufficient knowledge to perform the audit professionally.

ISA 310 points out that the sources of auditors' knowledge are:

1. previous working experience with the entity and its industry.
2. site visit including client's premises and plant facilities.
3. the client's minutes of meetings and other legal and non-legal documents.
4. the entity's directors and other personnel.
5. the internal auditors and audit committee of the entity.
6. the lawyers, surveyors and other experts who provided services to the entity.
7. the previous auditors and audit working papers.
8. the previous financial reports, budgets, internal control reports and interim financial reports.
9. the client's business partners including customers, suppliers and bankers.
10. economists, news reporters, regulators, and so on.
