= Audit plan =

Auditing guideline

Audit planning is a vital area of the [audit], primarily conducted at the beginning of audit process, to ensure that appropriate attention is devoted to important areas, potential problems are promptly identified, work is completed expeditiously and work is properly coordinated. "Audit planning" means developing a general strategy and a detailed approach for the expected nature, timing and extent of the audit. The auditor plans to perform the audit in an efficient and timely manner. In simple words, developing an overall strategy for the effective conduct and scope of the examination.

== Definition ==
An audit plan is the specific guideline to be followed when conducting an audit. it helps the auditor obtain sufficient appropriate evidence for the circumstances, helps keep audit costs at a reasonable level, and helps avoid misunderstandings with the client. Audit planning includes establishing the overall strategy for the audit engagement, with a particular focus on planned risk assessment procedures and responses to the identified risks of material misstatement.

It addresses the specifics of what, where, who, when and how:

- What are the audit objectives?
- Where will the audit be done? (i.e. scope)
- When will the audit occur? (how long?)
- Who are the auditors?
- How will the audit be done?

== Benefits of audit plan ==
- It helps the auditor obtain sufficient appropriate evidence for the circumstances.
- It helps to keep audit costs at a reasonable level.
- It helps to avoid misunderstandings with the client.
- It helps to ensure that potential problems are promptly identified.
- It helps to know the scope of audit program by an auditor.
- It helps to carry out the audit work smoothly and in a well defined manner.

== Process of audit planning ==
It includes following procedures

- Knowledge of client's business, which includes financing, legal framework, government norms, investments, accounting policies, business risk and financial risk
- Development of audit strategies or overall plan (who, when and how)
- Preparation of audit programmer

== See also ==
- Internal audit
- Risk-based auditing
- Financial audit
- Technical audit
- Cost auditing
