= Statutory auditor =

Auditor when appointed as mandated by law

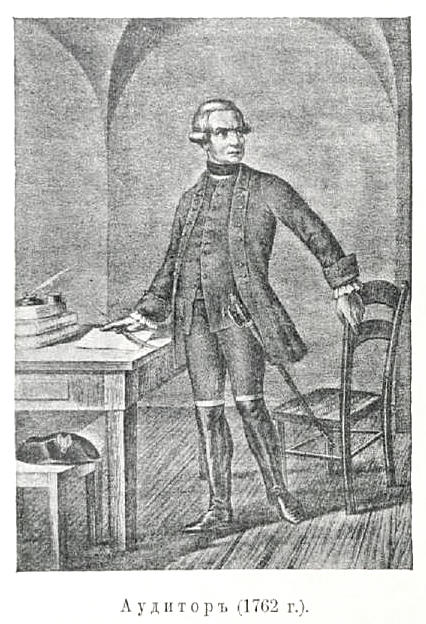
Statutory auditor (1762)

Statutory auditor is a title used in various countries to refer to a person or entity with an auditing role, whose appointment is mandated by the terms of a statute.

== World usage ==
A "statutory audit" is a legally required review of the accuracy of a company's or government's financial records. The purpose of a statutory audit is the same as the purpose of any other audit – to determine whether an organization is providing a fair and accurate representation of its financial position by examining information such as bank balances, bookkeeping records and financial transactions. The European Union has also made efforts to mandate statutory audits and statutory auditors on an EU-wide level.

=== By country ===
==== India ====
In India, the term "statutory auditor" refers to an external auditor whose appointment is mandated by law.

==== Japan ====
A statutory auditor (監査役, kansayaku) is an official found in Japanese kabushiki gaisha (business corporations). Similar roles are also found in Taiwan and South Korea, which use modified forms of Japanese corporate law, although the English translation most commonly employed for the role in these countries is supervisor or supervisory board.

Statutory auditors are elected by shareholders and hold a position in the hierarchy alongside the board of directors. A kabushiki kaisha must have at least one statutory auditor, unless the transfer of shares is restricted in the articles of incorporation. If the company is classified as a "large" company (i.e. with more than ¥500 million in paid-in capital or ¥20 billion in liabilities), it must have three statutory auditors, or an audit, compensation and nominating committee system similar to that used by public companies in the US.

Statutory auditors have several functions:

1. They initiate derivative suits against the board of directors on behalf of the shareholders, and represent the company in those suits. This right was once reserved for the auditor; however, following precedent from a recent lawsuit against Daiwa Bank, groups of shareholders can now file suits themselves without going through the auditor.
2. In "mid-size" and "large" companies (i.e. with more than ¥100 million of paid-in capital), they have the right to attend board meetings to monitor the directors' actions.
3. In "mid-size" companies, they audit the financial reports submitted by the company.
4. In "large" companies, they oversee auditing performed by external certified public accountants, i.e. external auditors.

Statutory auditors are often selected from among the senior management of the company, or are former directors of related companies (such as suppliers or keiretsu partners).

The role of the statutory auditor in Japan is distinct from the role of an external auditor or internal auditor as understood in English-speaking countries, which has led to some confusion when discussing their role in internationally prominent cases such as the Olympus scandal. The Japanese association of statutory auditors has recommended adopting the English title "audit & supervisory board member" to avoid such confusion.
