= Operational auditing =

Operational audit is a systematic review of effectiveness, efficiency and economy of operation. Operational audit is a future-oriented, systematic, and independent evaluation of organizational activities.

In Operational audit financial data may be used, but the primary sources of evidence are the operational policies and achievements related to organizational objectives. Operational audit is a more comprehensive form of an Internal audit.

The Institute of Internal Auditors (IIA) defines Operational Audit as a systematic process of evaluating an organization's effectiveness, efficiency and economy of operations under management's control and reporting to appropriate persons the results of the evaluation along with recommendations for improvement; see aside.

== See also ==
- Internal auditing
- Risk-based auditing
