= Risk-based internal audit =

Internal audit approach that prioritises areas with higher organisational risk

Risk-based internal audit (RBIA) is an internal methodology which is primarily focused on the inherent risk involved in the activities or system and provide assurance that risk is being managed by the management within the defined risk appetite level. It is the risk management framework of the management and seeks at every stage to reinforce the responsibility of management and BOD (Board of Directors) for managing risk.

== Overview ==
Risk based internal audit is conducted by internal audit department to help the risk management function of the company by providing assurance about the risk mitigation. RBIA allows internal audit to provide assurance to the board that risk management processes are managing risks effectively, in relation to the risk appetite.

== Risk capacity ==
Is the maximum amount of risk that an entity can bear which is linked to capital, liquid assets, borrowing capacity etc. Maximum amount of bearable risk by an entity.

== Risk appetite ==
It is the amount of risk that an entity (on broad level) willing to accept within its overall Capacity. It provides the threshold of acceptable risk and determining the risk appetite is continuous process, it can't be set once and leave. Risk appetite is developed on the basis of risk level of company like risk hunger company may develop high risk appetite while risk averse company may develop low risk appetite level.

== Risk ==
Risk is the potential of losing something of value, weighed against the potential to gain something of value. Risk hinders the achievement of objective and it has two attributes.

1. Likelihood: Probability of Risk Event (P)
2. Consequences: Impact of Risk Event (I)

In Risk based internal auditing two types of risks are considered.

Inherent risk

Risk that existed in the absence of any action or control or modification of an event.

Residual risk

Risk that remains after controls are implemented or we can say residual of inherent risk.

== Risk register ==
It is a log that contains all of the information related to the risk management activities. It includes following details related to risk management activities.

It contains;

1. Risks
2. Potential response
3. Root cause of risks
4. Risk categories and ranking

== Risk assessment ==
Allows an entity to understand the possibility and impact of risk event. Use two prospectives;

- Likelihood: Probability of risk event (P)
- Consequences: Impact of risk event (I)

== See also ==
- Cost auditing
- Technical audit
