= Michael Power (accountant) =

Professor of accounting at the London School of Economics

Michael Power FBA FCA is a British academic specializing in accounting, auditing, and risk management. He is Professor of Accounting at the London School of Economics and Political Science (LSE), where he has been a member of the faculty since 1987. His work focuses on the sociology of accounting, audit practices, and the organizational dynamics of risk management. He is widely known for developing the concept of the “audit society,” which examines the expansion of verification and monitoring practices across modern institutions.

He is a Fellow of the British Academy and a Fellow of the Institute of Chartered Accountants in England and Wales.

== Early life and education ==
Power was educated at St Edmund Hall, Oxford, where he completed a BA (Hons) in Philosophy, Politics and Economics in 1979. He later studied at Girton College, Cambridge, earning an MPhil in History and Philosophy of Science (1980) and a PhD in Philosophy (1984). He subsequently completed an MSc in Accounting and Finance at the London School of Economics in 1989.

== Academic career ==
Power joined the London School of Economics in 1987 as Lecturer in Accounting and Finance and was appointed Professor of Accounting in 1995. He later held the P. D. Leake Professorship of Accounting (1997–2004). He was a founding co-director of the Centre for Analysis of Risk and Regulation (CARR) from 1999 to 2005 and served as its director from 2010 to 2014. He also served as an Academic Governor of the LSE from 2016 to 2019.

Power has held visiting and fellowship positions at several international institutions, including All Souls College, Oxford; the Wissenschaftskolleg zu Berlin; and the University of Sydney.

Power served as a non-executive director of RIT Capital Partners plc from 2014 to 2023, where he was a member of the Audit and Risk Committee and the Valuation Committee. He chaired the Audit and Risk Committee from 2022 to 2023 and the Valuation Committee from 2018 to 2023, also serving as trustee and chair of the RIT Pension Scheme from 2018 to 2019. Power contributed to initiatives at the UK’s Financial Reporting Council, including the launch of the country’s first Financial Reporting Lab.

== Research ==
Power’s research examines the expansion of auditing and inspection practices beyond financial reporting into wider domains of organizational activity. He has examined how processes of monitoring, performance evaluation, and compliance checking have become embedded in public administration, corporate governance, and professional regulation.

Another strand of his research addresses the relationship between accounting practices and broader social and organizational processes. He has studied how accounting systems contribute to the construction of organizational knowledge, the standardization of practices, and the formation of infrastructures for documentation and verification. Traceability has recently become a major theme in his work.

== Honours and awards ==
Power was elected Fellow of the British Academy in 2016. He has received honorary doctorates from the University of St. Gallen (2009), Uppsala University (2013), and Turku School of Economics (2016).

In 2024 he received the James G. March Prize for best paper in Organization Theory for work on the “economy of traces.”

== Selected publications ==
=== Selected books ===
- Economy of Traces: Traceability, Tracking and the Accounts We Live By (Oxford University Press, 2026)
- Organized Uncertainty: Designing a World of Risk Management (Oxford University Press, 2007). Translated into Japanese in 2010.
- The Risk Management of Everything (London: Demos, 2004)
- The Audit Society: Rituals of Verification (Oxford University Press, 1997, (second paperback edition 1999). Translated into Italian (2002), Japanese (2003) and French (2005).
- The Audit Explosion (London: Demos1994). Translated into Turkish, 2024.

=== Selected journal articles ===
- ‘Theorising the economy of traces: from audit society to surveillance capitalism’ Organization Theory (2022) 3(3). https://doi.org/10.1177/26317877211052296 (Winner 2024 James G. March Prize for best paper in Organization Theory)
- ‘Modelling the microfoundations of the audit society: Organizations and the logic of the audit trail. Academy of Management Review (2021) 46:6-32. https://doi.org/10.5465/amr.2017.0212
- ‘The risk management of nothing’ Accounting, Organizations and Society (2009) 34(6/7): 849-55. https://doi.org/10.1016/j.aos.2009.06.001
