= SOFT audit =

Integrated SOFT Audit is an integrated audit approach that focuses on the key and material components of four differing audit approaches relevant to an auditee, based on a detailed risk assessment performed annually. This approach integrates the key aspects of:

- S – Sarbanes–Oxley Act of 2002 Compliance Audit
- O – Operational Audit/Best Industry Practices
- F – Financial Substantive Audit Procedures
- T – Transactional Auditing
