= Cost auditing =

Verification of cost accounts and plan adherence

A cost audit represents the verification of cost accounts and checking on the adherence to cost accounting plan. Cost audit ascertains the accuracy of cost accounting records to ensure that they are in conformity with cost accounting principles, plans, procedures and objectives. A cost audit comprises the following;

- Verification of the cost accounting records such as the accuracy of the cost accounts, cost reports, cost statements, cost data and costing technique
- Examination of these records to ensure that they adhere to the cost accounting principles, plans, procedures and objective
- To report to the government on optimum utilisation of national resources

== Objectives of cost audit ==
- Prospective objective: Under which cost audit aims to identify the undue wastage or losses and ensure that costing system determines the correct and realistic cost of production.
- Constructive objectives: Cost audit provides useful information to the management regarding regulating production, economical method of operation, reducing cost of operation and reformulating cost accounting plans.
- Other objectives:
  - The basic objective of cost audit is to ensure that the cost of production as well as cost of sales includes only those factors which are absolutely necessary and that those factors are used in the most efficient way.
  - To verify that cost accounts/records are accurate.
  - To detect all errors or frauds in cost records.
  - To introduce some sort of internal audit with a focus on costs to reduce the work of financial auditor.
  - Cost system must be different for different objectives and the cost auditor designs a system which works best and quickest.
  - To see that the organisation maintains proper cost books, accounts and records either required by law or otherwise as a managerial decision.
  - To verify that the basic principles of cost accountancy or related rules framed thereto to implement certain statutory provisions are properly carried out in maintaining cost accounts in the right manner.
  - To report on the optimum utilisation of national resources, to the government.

== Types of cost audit ==
- Cost audit on behalf of management
- Cost audit on behalf of a customer
- Cost audit on behalf of government
- Cost audit by trade association
- Statutory cost audit
- Circumstantial cost audit
- Retention price fixation
- Cost variation within the industry
- Inefficient management
- Tax assessment
- Trade bargains and dispute
- Cost audit under statute

== Qualification ==
Basic qualification for a cost auditor is the prescribed examinations and practices by the professional nd regulatory body for cost and management accountancy of the country. In case a person is the member of other professional bodies, exemption should be allowed to him/her under the mutual recognition agreements (MRAs) to become a cost auditor.

== Cost audit procedures ==
Cost audit comprises the following three steps:

- Review
- Verification
- Reporting

== Format of cost audit report ==
I/We,........................................... having been appointed as Cost Auditor(s) under Section ........ Companies Act of .........................................................(mention name of the company) having its registered office at .................................................... (mention registered office address of the company) (hereinafter referred to as the company), have audited the books of account prescribed under the said Act, and other relevant records in respect of the .................................... (mentions name/s of product group/s) for the period/year.............................(mention the financial year) maintained by the company and report, in addition to my/our observations and suggestions in para 2.

1. I/We have/have not obtained all the information and explanations, which to the best of my/our knowledge and belief were necessary for the purpose of this audit.
2. In my/our opinion, proper cost records, as per .............., have/have not been maintained by the company so as to give a true and fair view of the cost of production/operation, cost of sales and margin of the product/activity groups under reference.
3. In my/our opinion, proper returns adequate for the purpose of the Cost Audit have/have not been received from the branches not visited by me/us.
4. In my/our opinion and to the best of my/our information, the said books and records give/do not give the information required by the Companies Act, in the manner so required.
5. In my/our opinion, the said books and records are/are not in conformity with the Cost Accounting Standards issued by the Institute of Cost and Works Accountants of India, to the extent these are found to be relevant and applicable.
6. In my/our opinion, company has/has not adequate system of internal audit of cost records which to my/our opinion is commensurate to its nature and size of its business.
7. Detailed unit-wise and product/activity-wise cost statements and schedules thereto in respect of the product groups/activities under reference of the company duly audited and certified by me/us are/are not kept in the company.
8. As required under the provisions of ................, I/we have furnished Performance Appraisal Report, to the company, on the prescribed form.
- Observations and suggestions if any, of the cost auditor, relevant to the cost audit.

Date: (date of sudit report)

Place: (place where audit report was signed)

Signature of cost auditor

Membership number

== See also ==
- Cost accounting
