= Institute of Internal Auditors =

Professional association

The Institute of Internal Auditors
- Abbreviation: IIA
- Formation: November 1941
- Type: Professional Association
- Headquarters: Lake Mary, Florida, United States
- Region served: Global
- Members: 265,000+ (2026)
- President & CEO: Anthony J. Pugliese
- Chair of Global Board of Directors: Stefano Comotti (2025-2026)
- Website: www.theiia.org

The Institute of Internal Auditors (IIA) is an international professional association. The IIA offers professional certifications and provides education, research, and guidance for the internal audit profession.

== History ==
The IIA was established in November 1941 in New York City. Its first international chapter was formed in Toronto in 1944. Additional international expansion outside North America followed with chapters in London and Manila in 1948, and in Japan and Australia in 1952.

The IIA Code of Ethics was adopted in 1968 and a published a Common Body of Knowledge in 1972. The Certified Internal Auditor (CIA) designation was introduced in 1974. The IIA issued its first professional standards, the Standards for the Professional Practice of Internal Auditing, in 1978. In 1985, The IIA became one of the original sponsors of the Committee of Sponsoring Organizations of the Treadway Commission (COSO).

As of 2026, The IIA reported membership of approximately 265,000 members from 170 countries and territories. The organization's global headquarters are in Lake Mary, Florida, United States. Anthony J. Pugliese serves as the president and CEO of the organization.

== Professional certifications ==
The Certified Internal Auditor (CIA) certification is the primary professional designation offered by The IIA. The CIA is a globally recognized certification for internal auditors.

To earn the CIA designation, candidates must pass a three-part CIA and meet certain educational and professional experience requirements established by The IIA. The organization also offers the CIA certification through a one-part CIA Challenge Exam, for individuals who already hold certain qualifying professional designations, such as Certified Public Accountant (CPA), Chartered Accountant (CA), or Certified Information Systems Auditor (CISA).

CIAs are required to complete continuing professional education (CPE) annually to maintain their certifications.

As of 2024, more than 200,000 individuals worldwide held the CIA designation, with a significant concentration in the Asia-Pacific and North American regions.

=== Other currently awarded certifications ===
The IIA also offers the following certifications:

- Internal Audit Practitioner (IAP), which requires a one-part exam and is geared predominately for students and early-career professionals.
- Certification in Risk Management Assurance (CRMA), a one-part exam focused on risk management assurance in the audit field.

=== Active, but no longer awarded, certifications ===
The IIA previously offered several other certifications that are no longer awarded. Individuals who earned these designations prior to their discontinuation may continue to use them.

The certifications that were no longer awarded after June 30, 2021 include:

- Certification in Control Self-Assessment (CCSA)
- Certified Government Auditing Professional (CGAP)
- Certified Financial Services Auditor (CFSA)

The following certification was no longer awarded after December 31, 2022:

- Qualification in Internal Audit Leadership (QIAL)

== Professional standards ==
In 1978, The IIA released the first version of the Standards for the Professional Practice of Internal Auditing. These standards were revised periodically over the following decades as part of The International Professional Practices Framework (IPPF).

In 2024, The IIA approved a comprehensive revision titled the Global Internal Audit Standards, which took effect on January 9, 2025. The revised standards replaced the former International Standards for the Professional Practice of Internal Auditing.

The Global Internal Audit Standards are organized into five domains,15 principles, and 52 standards. The five domains address the purpose of internal auditing, ethics and professionalism, overall organizational governance, managing the internal audit function and performing internal audit services. The standards include requirements, implementation considerations, and examples of evidence of evidence to demonstrate conformance.

== Internal Audit Foundation ==
The Internal Audit Foundation is the philanthropic and research arm of the IIA. The Foundation advances the internal audit profession globally through independent research, thought leadership, grants, and scholarship programs designed to support current and future practitioners.

The Foundation publishes research and on emerging risks, governance, and the evolving role of internal audit, including the annual Global Risk in Focus and North American Pulse of Internal Audit reports, as well as studies addressing topics such as fraud, digital transformation, and organizational resilience.

In 2024, The Foundation released ‘Vision 2035: Creating Our Future Together,’ a global research initiative outlining future trends, capabilities, and strategic priorities shaping the internal audit profession over the next decade.

== Chapters & Institutes ==
The IIA global chapters features over 140 chapters and more than 120 international affiliates/national institutes spanning across 170 countries. There are at least 159 local chapters in North America alone.

Examples of Chapters in North America:

1. IIA Alaska
2. IIA Washington DC
3. IIA New Mexico

Example of Global Institutes:

1. IIA Australia
2. IIA Greece
3. IIA Malaysia

== See also ==
- Committee of Sponsoring Organizations of the Treadway Commission
- External audit, External auditor, Certified Public Accountant, and AICPA
- Internal Audit, Director of audit, Comptroller General, Inspector General
- Internal Control, Controller
