= Internal auditor =

Auditor within an organization or company

An internal auditor is an auditor who is appointed by the Board of directors of the company in order to carry out the internal audit function. Generally, an employee of the company acts as an internal auditor, whereas some companies appoint an external expert as an internal auditor.

Though an internal auditor is appointed by the management or an employee of the company, independence is the prime requisite for the execution of an internal audit. Compromise in independence may distort the objectivity of an internal audit.

An internal auditor is responsible to the Board functionally and administratively to the management of the company, and the auditor submits the report to the Board. Their job description is said to include financial record examination, compliance analysis, risk management, and theft and fraud detection skills, along with good communication.

== See also ==
- internal audit
