= Auditor =

Person who conducts an audit

An auditor is a person or a firm appointed by a company to execute an audit. To act as an auditor, a person should be certified by the regulatory authority of accounting and auditing or possess certain specified qualifications. Generally, to act as an external auditor of the company, a person should have a certificate of practice from the regulatory authority.

== Types of auditors ==
- External auditor/Statutory auditor is an independent firm engaged by the client subject to the audit, to express an opinion on whether the company's financial statements are free of material misstatements, whether due to fraud or error.

For publicly traded companies, external auditors may also be required to express an opinion over the effectiveness of internal controls over financial reporting. External auditors may also be engaged to perform other agreed-upon procedures, related or unrelated to financial statements. Most importantly, external auditors, though engaged and paid by the company being audited, should be regarded as independent.

- Internal Auditors are employed by the organizations they audit. They work for government agencies (federal, state and local); for publicly traded companies; and for non-profit companies across all industries.

The internationally recognised standard setting body for the profession is the Institute of Internal Auditors - IIA. The IIA has defined internal auditing as follows: "Internal auditing is an independent, objective assurance and consulting activity designed to add value and improve an organization's operations. It helps an organization accomplish its objectives by bringing a systematic, disciplined approach to evaluate and improve the effectiveness of risk management, control, and governance processes".
