= Index of auditing-related articles =

This page is a list of auditing topics.

== A ==
- Audit
- Auditor-General

== C ==
- Comptroller
- Control risk
  - Correctness
  - Cut-off

== D ==
- Detection risk
  - Due diligence
  - Engagement letter

== E ==
- Environmental audit
- External audit
- External auditor

== F ==
- Financial statement assertions
- Fraud deterrence

== G ==
- Going concern

== I ==
- Inherent risk
  - Internal audit
  - Internal auditor
  - Internal control
- International Federation of Accountants
- International Standards on Auditing

== M ==
- Management representations

== R ==
- Risk assessment

== S ==
- Sampling risk
  - Stocktaking
