= Management representation =

Declaration made to auditors

Management representation is a letter issued by a client to the auditor in writing as part of audit evidences. The representations letter covers all periods encompassed by the audit report, and is dated the same date of audit work completion. It is used to let the client's management declare in writing that everything is MRL and is sufficient and appropriate and without omission of material facts to the financial statements, to the best of the management's knowledge. It serves to document management's representations during the audit, reducing misunderstandings of management's responsibilities for the financial statements.

For audit evidence, it is reliable if the auditor has no other means of obtaining evidence. Examples may include situations involving contingent liabilities or off-balance-sheet liabilities. The person issuing the letter should have the appropriate authority or seniority in the organization to vouch on the issue.

In the case of contradictions between other sources of evidence and management representations, the auditor should conduct further investigations.

== See also ==
- ISA 500 Audit Evidence
- International Standards on Auditing
