= Audit substantive test =

Audit procedures to detect error or fraud

Substantive procedures (or substantive tests) are those activities performed by the auditor to detect material misstatement at the assertion level.

Management implicitly assert that account balances and disclosures and underlying classes of transactions do not contain any material misstatements: in other words, that they are materially complete, valid and accurate. Auditors gather evidence about these assertions by undertaking activities referred to as substantive procedures.

== Types of procedures ==
There are two categories of substantive procedures - substantive analytical procedures and tests of detail. Analytical procedures generally provide less reliable evidence than the tests of detail.

== Examples ==
For example, an auditor may: physically examine inventory as evidence that inventory shown in the accounting records actually exists (existence assertion); inspect supporting documents like invoices to confirm that sales did occur (occurrence); arrange for suppliers to confirm in writing the details of the amount owing at balance date as evidence that accounts payable is a liability (rights and obligation assertion); and make inquires of management about the collectibility of customers' accounts as evidence that trade debtors are accurate as to its valuation. Evidence that an account balance or class of transaction is not complete, valid or accurate is evidence of a substantive misstatement but only becomes a material misstatement when it is large enough that it can be expected to influence the decisions of the users of the financial statement.
