= Research Papers in Economics =

Bibliographic database for economics

- Producer: IDEAS: private EconPapers: Örebro University School of Business
- History: 1997–present

Access
- Cost: Free

Coverage
- Disciplines: Economics
- Record depth: Index, abstract, and full text
- Format coverage: Working papers, journals, books

Links
- Website: repec.org

Research Papers in Economics (RePEc) is a collaborative effort of hundreds of volunteers in many countries to enhance the dissemination of research in economics. The heart of the project is a decentralized database of working papers, preprints, journal articles, and software components. The project started in 1997. Its precursor NetEc dates back to 1993.

== Overview ==
RePEc provides links to over 4,400,000 full-text articles, working papers, books, book chapters and software components. Most contributions are freely downloadable, but copyright remains with the author or copyright holder. It is among the largest internet repositories of academic material in the world. the collected data is leveraged by several services, the main ones being the websites IDEAS and EconPapers for exploration of the bibliographic data, and the RePEc Author Service for author profiles and authority control. Many bibliographic providers also use all or part of the data.

Materials to RePEc can be added through a department or institutional archive or, if no institutional archive is available, through the Munich Personal RePEc Archive. Institutions are welcome to join and contribute their materials by establishing and maintaining their own RePEc archive.

Leading publishers, such as Elsevier and Springer, have their economics material listed in RePEc. RePEc collaborates with the American Economic Association's EconLit database to provide content from leading universities' working paper or preprint series to EconLit. Over 4000 journals and over 5600 working paper series have registered, for a total of over 4.8 million works, the majority of which are online.

The information in the database is used to create online profiles and rank about 70,000 registered economists. This allows also to rank institutions and regions. There are also many other rankings, including cohorts, sub-disciplines and graduate programs.

RePEc also indexes worldwide economics institutions through its Economic Departments, Institutes and Research Centers in the World (EDIRC) database.

RePEc promotes open-access journals and also benefits from open access for its own citation analysis efforts.

Since 2018, RePEc has used NamSor gender classifier to estimate female representation in Economics. As of August 2024, 18351 of 69211 economists are female, or a proportion of 26.5%.

== See also ==
- List of academic databases and search engines
- Social Science Research Network
