= Analytical procedures (finance auditing) =

Analytical procedures are one of many financial audit procedures which help an auditor understand an entity's business and changes in the business, and to identify potential risk areas to plan other audit procedures. It can also be an audit substantive test involving the evaluation of financial information made by a study of plausible relationships among both financial and non-financial data. Analytical procedures also encompass such investigation as is necessary of identified fluctuations or relationships that are inconsistent with other relevant information or that differ from expected values by a significant amount.

== Use and stage ==
Analytical procedures are performed at three stages of the audit: at the start, in the middle and at the end of the audit. These three stages are risk assessment procedures, substantive analytical procedures, and final analytical procedures.

- Risk assessment procedures are used to assist the auditor to better understand the business and to plan the nature, timing and extent of audit procedures.
- Substantive analytical procedures are used to obtain evidential matter about particular assertions related to account balances or classes of transactions.
- Final analytical procedures are used as an overall review of the financial information in the final review stage of the audit to assist when forming an overall conclusion as to whether the financial information is consistent with the auditor's understanding of the entity.

== Evidence ==
Analytical procedures include comparison of financial information (data in financial statement) with prior periods, budgets, forecasts, similar industries and so on. It also includes consideration of predictable relationships, such as gross profit to sales, payroll costs to employees, and financial information and non-financial information, for examples the CEO's reports and the industry news. Possible sources of information about the client include interim financial information, budgets, management accounts, non-financial information, bank and cash records, VAT returns, board minutes, and discussion or correspondence with the client at the year-end.

== Substantive analytical procedures ==
When designing and performing substantive analytical procedures, the auditor:

- Determines the suitability of the substantive analytical procedure for given assertions
- Evaluates the reliability of data used in forming an expectation
- Develops an expectation of recorded amounts or ratios
- Determines a threshold for differences to the expectation that is acceptable without further investigation in audit

If the difference between the expectation and the amount recorded by the entity exceeds the threshold, then the auditor investigates such differences.

== Auditing standards ==
- ISA 520 Analytical procedures
- AU-C 520 Analytical procedures
- AS 2305 Substantive analaytical procedures

== Current proposals ==
In June 2024, the PCAOB proposed a new AS 2305, Designing and Performing Substantive Analytical Procedures, to better align with the auditor’s risk assessment and to address the increasing use of technology tools in performing these procedures.

== See also ==
- Financial ratios
