= Inherent risk (accounting) =

Unmitigated Risk

Inherent risk, in a financial audit, measures the auditor's assessment at the assertion level of the likelihood that there are material misstatements, either individually or in aggregate, due to error or fraud in a class of transactions, account balance or disclosure before considering the effectiveness of internal control. If the auditor concludes that a high likelihood exist, the auditor will conclude that inherent risk is high.

Inherent risk is one of two components of the risk of material misstatement, i.e., the risk that the financial statements are materially misstated before audit. The other component is control risk.

Audit risk is a function of the risk of material misstatement and detection risk.

== See also ==
- Inherent risk
