= As low as reasonably practicable =

Safety management principle

As low as reasonably practicable (ALARP), or as low as reasonably achievable (ALARA), is a principle in the regulation and management of safety-critical and safety-involved systems. The principle is that the residual risk shall be reduced as far as reasonably practicable. In UK and NZ Health and safety law, it is equivalent to so far as is reasonably practicable (SFAIRP). In the US, ALARA is used in the regulation of radiation risks.

For a risk to be ALARP, it must be possible to demonstrate that the cost involved in reducing the risk further would be disproportionate to the benefit gained.

== Factors ==
Determining that a risk has been reduced to ALARP involves an assessment of the risk and costs involved in taking measures to avoid that risk, and a comparison of the two according to cost–benefit analysis (CBA). In this context, risk is the combination of the frequency (likelihood) and the consequence of a specified hazardous event. Several factors are likely to be considered when deciding whether or not a risk has been reduced as far as reasonably practicable:

- Health and safety guidelines and codes of practice
- Manufacturer's specifications and recommendations
- Industry practice
- International standards and laws
- Suggestions from advisory bodies
- Comparison with similar hazardous events in other industries
- Cost of further measures would be disproportionate to the risk reduction benefits they would achieve
- Cost of assessing the improvement gained in an attempted risk reduction. In extremely complex systems, this can be very high, and could be the limiting factor in practicability.

A difficulty arising in CBAs is assigning a meaningful and agreed financial value of life. In the context of ALARP, financial values to impacts to the environment, physical assets, production stoppage, company reputation, etc. are assigned, which also presents significant challenges to the analysis.

== Carrot diagrams ==
Carrot diagram

'Carrot diagrams' show high (normally unacceptable) risks at the upper/wider end and low (broadly acceptable) risks at the lower/narrower end, with a 'tolerable' or 'ALARP' region in between. They were originally developed by the Health and Safety Executive (HSE) to illustrate their framework for the Tolerability of Risk (TOR), which set out the HSE's approach to regulating safety risks. While the ALARP principle applies at all levels of risk under UK health and safety law, the TOR framework captures the concept that some risks are too great to be acceptable, whatever the benefit; while others are so low as to be insignificant. The HSE, as regulators, would not usually require further action to reduce these broadly acceptable risks unless reasonably practicable measures were available, although they would still take into account that duty holders must reduce risks wherever it is reasonably practicable to do so. Between the two extremes, risks can be tolerated in order to secure benefits, so long as they have been risk assessed and are kept ALARP.

Carrot diagrams are sometimes known as 'ALARP Triangles'. However, this can be misleading because they illustrate the Tolerability of Risk framework rather than the ALARP principle itself, and can be misinterpreted as meaning either that ALARP legally applies only in the tolerable region, or that risks in tolerable region are automatically ALARP.

== Origin in UK ==
The term ALARP arises from UK legislation, particularly the Health and Safety at Work etc. Act 1974, which requires "Provision and maintenance of plant and systems of work that are, so far as is reasonably practicable, safe and without risks to health". The phrase So Far As is Reasonably Practicable (SFARP) in this and similar clauses is interpreted as leading to a requirement that risks must be reduced to a level that is As Low As is Reasonably Practicable (ALARP).

The key question in determining whether a risk is ALARP is the definition of reasonably practicable. This term has been enshrined in the UK case law since the case of Edwards v. National Coal Board in 1949. The ruling was that the risk must be significant in relation to the sacrifice (in terms of money, time or trouble) required to avert it: risks must be averted unless there is a gross disproportion between the costs and benefits of doing so.

Including gross disproportion means that an ALARP judgement in the UK is not a simple cost benefit analysis, but is weighted to favour carrying out the safety improvement. However, there is no broad consensus on the precise factor that would be appropriate: the HSE recommends that the bias towards safety "has to be argued in the light of all the circumstances applying to the case and the precautionary approach that these circumstances warrant".

The ALARP or ALARA principle is mandated by particular legislation in some countries outside the UK, including Australia, the Netherlands and Norway. Where the ALARP principle is used, it may not have the same implications as in the UK, as "reasonably practicable" may be interpreted according to the local culture, without introducing the concept of gross disproportionality.

== In USA ==
The term ALARA, or "as low as reasonably achievable" is used interchangeably in the United States of America. It is used in the field of radiation protection. Its application in the regulation of radiation risk in some areas has been challenged.

== In Canada ==
Health Canada's Medical Devices Directorate is transitioning from the ALARP standard to AFAP ("As Far As Possible") in the regulation of risk of medical devices. The ALARP concept can be interpreted to promote financial consideration in higher regard than of the requirements of safety and performance of medical devices. Contradicting this approach, AFAP requires that all ventures of safety must be addressed in the intent of the consumer and effectiveness of the product rather than capital gain of the corporation. Risks previously deemed 'negligible' may be ignored under the old standard but must be taken into account and included in risk analysis under the newer AFAP-based standard. Under AFAP standards there are two defined justifications for the lack of implementation of risk-preventative measures. The first indicates that the additional risk control will not provide additional support for the system, such as an additional alarm when a previous alarm is functioning. The second states that a risk control system does not have to be implemented if there is a more effective risk control that can not be simultaneously executed due to various scenarios such as spatial boundaries. By implementing this new standard of risk mitigation, companies must demonstrate that they have considered and implemented all necessary means of addressing risk of a product or developed system.

== In Australia ==
In Australia the Work Health & Safety Act 2011 introduced the term So Far As Is Reasonably Practical (SFAIRP) based on the UK legislation. In some industry sectors the term SFARIP has become the common usage and can be used interchangeably with ALARP, but some people believe that SFAIRP and ALARP are two different legal tests.

== Legal ==
A two-year legal battle in the European Court of Justice resulted in the SFAIRP principle being upheld on 18 January 2007. The European Commission had claimed that the SFAIRP wording in the Health & Safety at Work Act did not fully implement the requirements of the Framework Directive. The Directive gives employers an absolute duty "to ensure the safety and health of workers in every aspect related to the work", whereas the Act qualifies the duty "So Far As is Reasonably Practicable". The court dismissed the action and ordered the commission to pay the UK's costs. Had the case been upheld, it would have called into question the proportionate approach to safety risk management embodied in the ALARP principle.

== See also ==
- Bureaucratic drift
- Conflict of interest
- Principal–agent problem
- Ratchet effect
- Safety integrity level
