= ISA 320 Audit Materiality =

International Standard on Auditing

ISA 320 Audit Materiality is one of the International Standards on Auditing. It serves to expect the auditor is to establish an acceptable materiality level in design the audit plan.

Materiality: The amount by which the Financial Statements must change in order to change the decisions made by users of the Financial Statements.

There are no hard rules over materiality and items can be material by nature as well as by value. Examples of items that are material by nature are bank balances and directors emoluments. These are material by nature as they are perceived as integral to a user's view of a company.

For an item to be material by value many different measures can be used, one of the most common is to use 0.5 - 1% of turnover. Adjustments that would not move profit by more than this will not be put through the accounts as they would not change a user's understanding of the accounts.
