= Substitution of attorney =

Legal document to replace an attorney

A substitution of attorney is an American legal term that refers to "the right of a client to change the person who is representing them before a court of law," and also the legal document to effectuate their right, which may be drafted during a lawsuit if a party wishes to replace its attorney with another one. Both attorneys and the "affected client" must sign the document (which is otherwise void); many courts require a specific form for that court or jurisdiction.

In certain cases, the "attorney may also request substitution under certain conditions. Some examples being a client’s illegal course of action, mistrust, lack of cooperation, or a client’s refusal to pay attorney’s fees, etc." There is a whole body of case law in each state about when that is possible. The American Bar Association Rules of Professional Conduct has a specific rule, Rule 1.16, that explains when and how an attorney may or may not withdraw ethically from representing a client.

== See also ==
- Engagement letter
- Statute of frauds
