= ISA 500 Audit Evidence =

ISA 500 Audit Evidence is one of the International Standards on Auditing. It serves to guide the auditor on obtaining audit evidence through the application of an appropriate mix of tests of control systems and substantive tests of transaction and balances.

It requests the auditor to obtain 'sufficient' and 'appropriate' audit evidence in order to draw reasonable conclusions on which to base the audit opinion.

The auditor considers reliability of audit evidence collected. For instance, audit evidence is more reliable when it exists in documentary form rather than subsequent oral representation of the matters. Auditors consider reliability of information but involve little authentication of evidence.

== Financial statement assertions ==
It is stated in ISA 315 (paragraph A.124) that the auditor should use assertions for classes of transactions, account balances, and presentation and disclosures in sufficient detail to form a basis for the assessment of risks of material misstatement and the design and performance of further audit procedures.

The auditor uses assertions in assessing risks by considering potential misstatements that may occur, and thereby designing audit procedures that are responsive to the particular risks.

Assertions used by the auditor fall into the following categories:
(a) Assertions about classes of transactions and events for the period ended:

1. Occurrence
2. Completeness
3. Accuracy
4. Cut-off
5. Classification

(b) Assertions about account balances at the period end:

1. Existence
2. Rights and obligations
3. Completeness
4. Valuation and allocation

(c) Assertions about presentation and disclosure:

1. Occurrence
2. Completeness
3. Classification and understandability
4. Accuracy and valuation

The assertions are not individually assessed but quite often at the same time. For example, to ensure completeness of electricity expense, the auditor ensures the 12 months of payments were booked. Since the client may record the bills paid on a cash basis, electricity expense of a month of previous basis period might be entered in the current year. Electricity expense of last month of current year might be recorded next year. If the monthly fluctuation is immaterial, the auditor always ignore the cut-off issue. In case where electricity is a material expense, the auditor considers preparing adjustments for year ended cut-off purpose so that the profit or loss would not be materially misstated.

Methods or techniques of audit evidence gathering are classified in 7 categories: 1. Inspection This involves physical examination of supporting accounting documentation, contracts, records and board of director minutes. It also includes physical examination of the assets. This enables the auditor to verify the existence but not necessarily ownership and valuation of assets. 2. Observation This involves looking at a process or procedure being performed by others. For instance, observation of payment of wages and salaries, physical count of inventory or opening of mail. This helps the auditor to have an assurance whether official procedures are followed 3. Inquiry Inquiry consists of seeking information of knowledgeable person inside or outside the entity. It may range from formal written inquiry to oral inquiries.

Confirmation consists of corroborating evidence from third parties with the internal evidence. For instance the auditor may verify accounts receivables by circularizing the debtors. 4. Confirmation (audit) 5. Re-performance 6. Analytical procedures 7. Recalculation, it means to check the mathematical accuracy of the figures in the book, for e.g.; Reculation of Accruals and Prepayments This involves analysis of significant accounting ratios and trend performance including investigations of fluctuations that occur between the current financial performance with the previous one and check whether other information is consistent with such relationship.

For example, the auditor perform vouching to ensure such electricity expense occurred and whether correct amount was booked. The auditor compares electricity expense of current and last year to see whether there are fluctuations. If there are huge fluctuations, the auditor may examine electricity together with rental expense, water expense to find out reasons.
