= Working paper =

Research paper or technical report

A working paper or work paper refers to literature that has not been peer reviewed or published in an academic journal. Working papers may be disseminated for the purpose of receiving feedback to improve the publication. They are often the basis for related works, and may themselves be cited by peer-reviewed papers. They may be considered as grey literature.

Sometimes the term working paper is used synonymously as technical report. Working papers are typically hosted on websites belonging either to the author or the author's affiliated institution. The United Nations uses the term "working paper" in approximately this sense for the draft of a resolution.

Documents required for a minor to get a job in certain states within the United States are sometimes called working papers. Such papers usually require the employer, parent/guardian, school, and a physician to agree to the terms of work laid out by the employer.

Audit working papers are documents required on an audit of a company's financial statements. In an external audit, the working papers are the property of the accounting firm conducting the audit; in an internal audit, they belong to the organisation. These papers are formally referred to as audit documentation (per PCAOB and international auditing standards) or as the audit documentation file. The documents serve as proof of audit procedures performed, evidence obtained, and the conclusions the auditor reached.
