= Pontis =

Pontis is a software application developed to assist in managing highway bridges and other structures. Known as AASHTOWare Bridge Management since version 5.2, Pontis stores bridge inspection and inventory data based on the U.S. Federal Highway Administration (FHWA) National Bridge Inventory system coding guidelines. In addition, the system stores condition data for each of a bridge's structural elements.

The system is designed to support the bridge inspection process, recommend a bridge preservation policy, predict future bridge conditions, and recommend projects to perform on one or more bridges to derive the most agency and user benefit from a specified budget. The system uses a Markovian Decision Process to model bridge deterioration and recommend an optimal preservation policy. It uses the Markovian model results, in conjunction with a simulation model, to predict future conditions and recommend work.

== History ==
In 1991, the FHWA sponsored the development of a bridge management system called "Pontis" which is derived from the Latin pons, meaning bridge. The system is owned by the American Association of State Highway and Transportation Officials (AASHTO). Many states began using Pontis when the Intermodal Surface Transportation Efficiency Act required each state to implement a system. As of 2008 It was licensed by AASHTO to over 45 U.S. state transportation departments and other organizations in the U.S. and other countries.

InspectTech belonging to Bentley Systems is the contractor for ongoing development and support of Pontis. Previous Pontis developers included Cambridge Systematics, Inc., Optima, Inc., and the Michael Baker Corporation.

== See also ==
- Bridge management system
- Management system
