= Detection risk =

Detection Risk (DR) is the risk that the auditor will not detect a misstatement that exists in an assertion that could be material, either individually or when aggregated with other misstatements. In other words, the chance that the auditor will not find material misstatements relating to an assertion in the financial statements through substantive test and analysis. Detection risk results in the auditor's conclusion that no material errors are present where in fact there are. It is a component of audit risk.

Detection Risk and quality of audit have an inverse relationship: if detection risk is too high, the lower the quality of the audit and if detection risk is low, generally the quality of the audit increases.

== See also ==
- Audit risk
- Sampling error
- Non-sampling error
