= Edwards v National Coal Board =

1949 English court case

Edwards v. National Coal Board 1949 All ER 743 (CA) was an important case in English case law. The 1949 case revolved around whether it was "reasonably practicable" to prevent even the smallest possibility of a rock fall in a coal mine.

== Underlying facts ==
Mr Joseph Edwards was employed as a colliery timberman at Marine Colliery. He was walking along a mine roadway (or level) when a large amount of material fell on him from the side of the road, killing him. The wall of the roadway was reported to consist of "very hard fireclay", which was not additionally supported by timber or lining. The fall was caused by a defect known as a "glassy slant", which is "hard, shiny and slippery material that does not bind properly with the adjacent material", and in this case was a fossilised tree.

== Legal questions arising ==
As stated by Lord Justice Tucker, the Coal Mines Act 1911 placed an absolute duty on the mine-owner to "make the roof and sides of every travelling road secure" and that the only defence against civil liability for a breach of this would be if the mine-owner can prove that it was "not reasonably practicable to avoid or prevent the breach".

The National Coal Board argued that the walls and sides of the roadway had been "very strong and firm" with nothing to indicate a latent defect and that, if this roadway had to be supported or lined, then it followed that every other roadway in every mine would have similarly supported, which was too expensive (not reasonably practicable).

== Outcome ==
The case turned when it was decided that it was not 'all of the roadways' that needed shoring up; just the ones that required it. In essence this established the need to carry out a risk assessment to establish the cost, time and trouble to mitigate a risk balanced against the risk of any harm it might cause. The National Coal Board had not done this.

Asquith stated in his judgment:

"Reasonably practicable" is a narrower term than "physically possible" and seems to me to imply that a computation must be made by the owner, in which the quantum of risk is placed on one scale and the sacrifice involved in the measures necessary for averting the risk (whether in money, time or trouble) is placed in the other; and that if it be shown that there is a gross disproportion between them – the risk being insignificant in relation to the sacrifice – the defendants discharge the onus on them. Moreover, this computation falls to be made by the owner at a point of time anterior to the accident.

== Significance ==
This case was not the first to establish the concept of "reasonable practicability", which was already in the Coal Mines Act 1911 and had been considered in Coltness Iron v. Sharp (1938). However, the case set precedent for the interpretation of "reasonably practicable". The Court of Appeal decided that "reasonably practicable" was a more narrowly defined phrase than what was "physically possible." This allowed for the creation of equations that measured the risk present in a given situation against the reasonable practicability of mitigating that risk. In other words, the equation asked if averting the risk was worth the effort it took to negate that risk. In addition, the court in Edwards determined that the size and wealth of the company should have no bearing on such decisions.

== See also ==
- ALARP
- National Coal Board
