= National Bridge Inventory =

Database on all bridges and tunnels in the United States

The National Bridge Inventory (NBI) is a database, compiled by the Federal Highway Administration, with information on all bridges and tunnels in the United States that have roads passing above or below them. That is similar to the grade-crossing identifier number database, compiled by the Federal Railroad Administration, which identifies all railroad crossings. The bridge information includes the design of the bridge and the dimensions of the usable portion. The data is often used to analyze bridges and to judge their condition. The inventory is developed for the purpose of having a unified database for bridges to ensure the safety of the traveling public, as required by the Federal Aid Highway Act of 1968. It includes identification information, bridge types and specifications, operational conditions, bridge data including geometric data and functional description, and inspection data. Any bridge more than 20 ft (6 m) long used for vehicular traffic is included.

== Description ==
Identification information addresses the bridge location uniquely, classifies the type of the routes carried out on and/or under the structure, and locates the bridge within the spatial location. Each bridge is given a number by the highway department of the respective state or agency that maintains the bridge. The method of assigning numbers differs from one state to the next but provides a unique number for each bridge in the state.

The bridge inventory is developed for having a unified database for bridges, including the identification information; bridge types and specifications; operational conditions; and bridge data including geometric data, functional description, inspection data, etc. Bridge type and specifications classify the type of the bridge. That part provides defined standard categories for classification of the bridges. It also identifies the material of the bridge components, deck, and deck surface. Operational conditions provide information about the age of the structure and construction year, rehabilitation year, type of services and traffic carried over, and/or under the structure number of the lanes over and/or under the bridges, average daily traffic, average daily truck traffic and information regarding to bypass, detours. Furthermore, the bridge inventory contains information regarding to inspection data, ratings assigned by inspectors, and appraisal results.

== Condition ratings ==
The NBI includes a structural evaluation of deck, superstructure, substructure, and culvert on a 0-9 scale:

Description	Code
NOT APPLICABLE	N
EXCELLENT CONDITION	9
VERY GOOD CONDITION – no problems noted.	8
GOOD CONDITION – some minor problems.	7
SATISFACTORY CONDITION – structural elements show some minor deterioration.	6
FAIR CONDITION – all primary structural elements are sound but may have minor section loss, cracking, spalling, or scour.	5
POOR CONDITION – advanced section loss, deterioration, spalling or scour.	4
SERIOUS CONDITION – loss of section, deterioration, spalling or scour have seriously affected primary structural components. Local failures are possible. Fatigue cracks in steel or shear cracks in concrete may be present.	3
CRITICAL CONDITION – advanced deterioration of primary structural elements. Fatigue cracks in steel or shear cracks in concrete may be present or scour may have removed substructure support. Unless the bridge is closely monitored, it may be necessary to close the bridge until corrective action is taken.	2
"IMMINENT" FAILURE CONDITION – major deterioration or section loss present in critical structural components or obvious vertical or horizontal movement affecting structure stability. Bridge is closed to traffic but corrective action may put back in light service.	1
FAILED CONDITION – out of service – beyond corrective action.	0

Code "N" (NOT APPLICABLE) is used for item 62 (culvert rating) when the structure is a bridge or for items 58, 59, and 60 (deck, superstructure rating, substructure rating, and respectively) when the structure is a (bridge length, i.e. 20 ft) culvert.

The term "functionally obsolete" has been removed from published NBI data, as it is no longer tracked. Prior to 2016, the term was a collective designation for bridges ranked as a code 3 or lower.

The NBI can classify bridges as "structurally deficient," which means that the condition of the bridge includes a significant defect, which often means that speed or weight limits must be put on the bridge to ensure safety; a rating of 4 or lower on any of items 58, 59, 60, or 62 (deck, superstructure, substructure, and culverts, respectively) qualifies a bridge as "structurally deficient."

In December 2008, 72,868 bridges in the United States (12.1%) were categorized as "structurally deficient," representing an estimated $48 billion in repairs, and 89,024 (12.2%) were rated "functionally obsolete," representing an estimated $91 billion in replacement costs.

Some bridges are also identified as "fracture critical," which means that the failure of a single major tension member or member element will cause a significant portion or the entire bridge to collapse because of the lack of redundancy. Fracture-critical designs can leave bridges vulnerable to collisions with ships or large trucks, as in the I-5 Skagit River Bridge collapse in 2013 and the Francis Scott Key Bridge collapse in 2024.

== Issues and usage ==
The NBI was subjected to scrutiny and questions after new actions revealed that it might be outdated or inaccurate. Federal officials attempted to order emergency inspections of all steel truss bridges after a major bridge collapsed in Minneapolis in 2007. However, it was found that many records in the NBI were inaccurate or out of date.

The NBI is used for federal funding purposes. A "bridge sufficiency rating" is calculated, which is based 55% on the structural evaluation, 30% on the obsolescence of its design, and 15% on its importance to the public. As of 2008, a score of 80 or less is required for federal repair funding or 50 or less for federal replacement funding.

Since the NBI data is widely used by researchers and practitioners, the Federal Highway Administration made it available in 2021 in a relational database, Long-Term Bridge Performance (LTBP).

== See also ==
- Pontis
- Long-Term Pavement Performance
