= Audit working papers =

Documents for audit evidence

Audit working papers are the documents which record during the course of audit evidence obtained during financial statements auditing, internal management auditing, information systems auditing, and investigations. Audit working papers are used to support the audit work done in order to provide the assurance that the audit was performed in accordance with the relevant auditing standards. They show the audit was:

- Properly planned;
- Carried out properly
- There was adequate supervision;
- That the appropriate review was undertaken; and
- That the evidence is sufficient and appropriate to support the audit opinion

The Institute of Internal Auditors, a global professional audit standards body, has issued practice advisory 2330-1 stating the goals of audit working papers are to:

- Document the planning, performance, and review of audit work;
- Provide the principal support for audit communication such as observations, conclusions, and the final report;
- Facilitate third-party reviews and re-performance requirements; and
- Provide a basis for evaluating the internal audit activity's quality control program.

The audit working paper are divided into two parts: The first group consists of the current file and second group contains the permanent file.

1. The material relating to the current year only is placed in current file
2. The data to be used for a number of years placed in permanent file. The auditor can rely on the facts and figures recorded in permanent files.

Audit working papers are the property of the auditor. In order to keep professional ethic, it cannot reveal to third parties without client consent unless limited specified situations mentioned in ISA 230 Documentation and required by law, the examples are court order, for public interest and so on.

The forms of documentation may be flowchart, manual, narrative note, checklist, or questionnaire.

== Proper features or purpose ==
Features of Audit documentation are defined by related audit standards ie. IFRS, USGAAP. Following features might be considered as minimum:

- Reviewed by auditors with supervisors noted.
- Signed, dated and approved by relevant level of audit staff with sufficient cross reference.
- With evidence of effective audit planning, work done, sufficient and quality evidence.
- Outstanding matters are cleared in due course.
