= Qualitative risk analysis =

Technique for assessing the risk associated with a hazard

Qualitative risk analysis is a technique for assessing the risk associated with a hazard. Risk assessment is used for uncertain events that could have many outcomes and for which there could be significant consequences. Risk is a function of probability of an event (a particular hazard occurring) and the consequences given the event occurs. Probability refers to the likelihood that a hazard will occur. In a qualitative assessment, probability and consequence are not numerically estimated, but are evaluated verbally using qualifiers like high likelihood, low likelihood, etc. Qualitative assessments are good for screening level assessments when comparing/screening multiple alternatives or for when sufficient data is not available to support numerical probability or consequence estimates. Once numbers are inserted into the analysis (either by quantifying the likelihood of a hazard or quantifying the consequences) the analysis transitions to a semi-quantitative or quantitative risk assessment.

== Qualitative techniques ==
There are several techniques when performing qualitative risk analysis to determine the probability and impact of risks, including the following:

- Brainstorming, interviewing, Delphi technique
- Historical data
- Strength, weakness, opportunity, and threats analysis (SWOT analysis)
- Risk rating scales

== Developing rating scales ==
Assigning probability and impacts to risks is a subjective exercise. Some of this subjectivity can be eliminated by developing rating scales that are agreed upon by the sponsor, project manager, and key team members. Some organizations, particularly those that have project management offices responsible for overseeing all projects, have rating scales already developed.
