= Materiality (auditing) =

Concept in auditing and accounting

Materiality is a concept or convention within auditing and accounting relating to the importance/significance of an amount, transaction, or discrepancy. The objective of an audit of financial statements is to enable the auditor to express an opinion on whether the financial statements are prepared, in all material respects, in conformity with an identified financial reporting framework, such as the Generally Accepted Accounting Principles (GAAP) which is the accounting standard adopted by the U.S. Securities and Exchange Commission (SEC).

As a simple example, an expenditure of ten cents on paper is generally immaterial, and, if it were forgotten or recorded incorrectly, then no practical difference would result, even for a very small business. However, a transaction of many millions of dollars is almost always material, and if it were forgotten or recorded incorrectly, then financial managers, investors, and others would make different decisions as a result of this error than they would have had the error not been made. The assessment of what is material – where to draw the line between a transaction that is big enough to matter or small enough to be immaterial – depends upon factors such as the size of the organization's revenues and expenses, and is ultimately a matter of professional judgment.

== Definitions ==
=== Materiality in accounting ===
The stated mission of the IFRS Foundation is to develop a single set of global financial reporting standards based on established principles.

These reporting standards consist of a growing number of individual standards. The Conceptual Framework is not an International Financial Reporting Standard (IFRS) itself and nothing in the Framework overrides any specific IFRS. However, the Framework has as its purpose to, inter alia, assist the International Accounting Standards Board (IASB) and individual national standard-setting bodies in promoting harmonization of regulations, accounting standards and procedures relating to the presentation of financial statements by providing a basis for reducing the number of alternative accounting treatments permitted by IFRSs.

Chapter 3 of the Conceptual Framework deals specifically with the quantitative characteristics of financial information that make it useful to the users of the financial statements. Paragraphs QC6 to QC11 provides guidance to determine when information is relevant and when it is not. In determining the relevance of financial information, regard needs to be given to its materiality. Information is said to be material if omitting it or misstating it could influence decisions that users make on the basis of an entity's financial statements. Put differently, "materiality is an entity-specific aspect of relevance, based on the size, or magnitude, or both," of the items to which financial information relates. The IASB has declined to specify a uniform quantitative threshold for materiality, or to predetermine what could be material in a particular situation, because of this entity-specific nature of materiality.

On 31 October 2018, the International Accounting Standards Board amended the definition of materiality in IFRS Standards by amending IAS 1 and IAS 8. The amended definition of materiality is effective from 1 January 2020:

Information is material if omitting, misstating or obscuring it could reasonably be expected to influence the decisions that the primary users of general purpose financial statements make on the basis of those financial statements, which provide financial information about a specific reporting entity.

The concept of materiality in accounting is strongly correlated with the concept of Stakeholder Engagement. The main guidelines on the preparation of non-financial statements (GRI Standards and IIRC <IR> Framework) underline the centrality of the principle of materiality and the involvement of stakeholders in this process.

=== Materiality in auditing ===
The International Auditing and Assurance Standards Board (IAASB) is an independent standard-setting body that serves the public interest by setting high-quality international standards for auditing, assurance, and other related standards. The IAASB issues the International Standards on Auditing, which consists of a growing number of individual standards.

In terms of ISA 200, the purpose of an audit is to enhance the degree of confidence of intended users in the financial statements. The auditor expresses an opinion on whether the financial statements are prepared, in all material respects, in accordance with an applicable financial reporting framework, such as IFRS. ISA 320, paragraph A3, states that this assessment of what is material is a matter of professional judgement.

The concept of materiality is applied by the auditor both in planning and performing the audit, and in evaluating the effect of identified misstatements on the audit and of uncorrected misstatements, if any, on the financial statements and in forming the opinion in the auditor’s report.

ISA 320, paragraph 10, requires that "planning materiality" be set prior to the commencement of detailed testing. ISA 320, paragraph 12 requires that materiality be revised as the audit progresses, if (and only if) information is revealed that, if known at the onset of the audit, would have caused the auditor to set a lower materiality. In practice, materiality is re-assessed at least once, during the conclusion of the audit, prior to the issuing of the audit report. This materiality is referred to as "final materiality".

ISA 320, paragraph 11, requires the auditor to set "performance materiality". ISA 320, paragraph 9, defines performance materiality as an amount or amounts that is less than the materiality for the financial statements as a whole ("overall materiality"). It includes materiality that is applied to particular transactions, account balances or disclosures. Paragraph 9 also states that the purpose of setting performance materiality is to reduce the risk that the aggregate total of uncorrected misstatements could be material to the financial statements.

In terms of ISA 320, paragraph A1, a relationship exists between audit risk and materiality. This relationship is inverse. The higher the audit risk, the lower the materiality will be set. The lower the audit risk, the higher the materiality will be set.

In terms of the Conceptual Framework (see "materiality in accounting" above), materiality also has a qualitative aspect. This means that, even if a misstatement is not material in "Dollar" (or other denomination) terms, it may still be material because of its nature. An example is if a disclosure is omitted from the financial statements.

=== Materiality in securities regulation ===
Materiality is also a concept used in securities regulation. However, some experts regard the concept as inadequately defined, based only on the development of case law.

== Methods of calculating materiality ==
The IASB has refrained from giving quantitative guidance for the mathematical calculation of materiality. While ISA 320, paragraph A3, does provide for the use of benchmarks to calculate materiality, it does not suggest a particular benchmark or formula. Several common rules to quantify materiality have been developed by academia.

=== Methods from a study funded by the Norwegian Research Council ===
These include single-rule methods and variable size rule methods.

Single rule methods:

- 5% of pre-tax income;
- 0.5% of total assets;
- 1% of equity;
- 1% of total revenue.

"Sliding scale" or variable-size methods:

- 2% to 5% of gross profit if less than $20,000;
- 1% to 2% of gross profit, if gross profit is more than $20,000 but less than $1,000,000;
- 0.5% to 1% of gross profit, if gross profit is more than $1,000,000 but less than $100,000,000;
- 0.5% of gross profit, if gross profit is more than $100,000,000.

Blended methods involve combining some or all of these methods, by using an appropriate weighting for each element.

=== Methods from Discussion Paper 6: Audit Risk and Materiality, as issued in July 1984 ===
These methods offer a suggested range for the calculation of materiality. Based on the audit risk, the auditor will select a value inside this range.

- 0.5% to 1% of gross revenue;
- 1% to 2% of total assets;
- 1% to 2% of gross profit;
- 2% to 5% of shareholders' equity;
- 5% to 10% of net profit.

These ranges can also be combined into blended methods.

=== Other, unverified methods ===
A concave function, such as the "gauge" formula. Gauge is a measure of materiality that experiences a decreasing returns to scale as opposed to the other traditional quantitative metrics aforementioned. The concave nature of the function leads to a lower materiality threshold (which implies less tolerance for misstatement) as the company becomes larger because more users are relying on the financial statements. Although the formula varies, a typical structure is as follows:

$$M=\beta \cdot (\max{(\sum_{i=1}^{N}{Assets_i},\sum_{i=1}^{N}{Revenues_i})})^{\alpha} .\,$$

where... $\beta=\,$ a non-zero, non-negative constant; usually $\beta >1.\,$

$\alpha=\,$ a constant that is between zero and one, i.e. $0<\alpha<1.\,$
$i=1,2,...,N \,$ for each asset or revenue account, transaction, etc.

Materiality, if quantified in any of the above ways, is a function of company size as measured by assets and revenues: the larger the company, the larger materiality limit.

Using different means to quantify materiality causes inconsistency in materiality thresholds. Since "planning materiality" should affect the scope of both tests of controls and substantive tests, such differences might be of importance. Two different auditors auditing even the same entity might generate differing scopes of audit procedures, solely based on the "planning materiality" definition used.

== Materiality in governmental auditing ==
Materiality in governmental auditing is different from materiality in private sector auditing for several reasons.

Most importantly, due to the format of state and local government financial statements under GAAP, the AICPA Audit Guide for State and Local Governments requires auditors to consider materiality by "opinion unit" rather than for the financial statements taken as a whole. The Guide defines opinion units as follows:

Government-wide level (three units):

1. Governmental activities;
2. Business type activities; and
3. Discretely presented component units in the aggregate.

Fund level (at least two):

1. General fund (always a major fund);
2. Other major funds determined for government funds or enterprise funds. Each major fund is an opinion unit. If there are no major funds, then there will be only two opinion units—the general fund and the remaining fund information; and
3. Remaining fund information, consisting of all other non-major governmental and enterprise funds, internal service fund type, and fiduciary fund type. (This will generally always be present, although the individual components and size will change between governmental entities.)

This functionally decreases materiality for state and local government financial statements by an order of magnitude compared to materiality for private company financial statements. Due to the unique concept of materiality, the auditor's report expresses an opinion in relation to each opinion unit.

Moreover, the primary users of government financial statements are different: the citizenry and the parliament in the public sector versus investors in the private sector. It is important to identify the primary users since materiality reflects the auditor’s judgment of the needs of users in relation to the information in the financial statements.

Finally, in government auditing, the political sensitivity to adverse media exposure often concerns the nature rather than the size of an amount, such as illegal acts, bribery, corruption and related-party transactions. Qualitative considerations of materiality are therefore different from in private-sector auditing, in which qualitative considerations are focused on the effect on earnings per share, executive bonuses or other risks that are not applicable to governments. Qualitative materiality refers to the nature of a transaction or amount and includes many financial and non-financial items that, independent of the amount, may influence the decisions of a user of the financial statements.

While rules of thumb mentioned in the section above are commonly applied to state and local government financial statements, government auditors may also use different means to quantify materiality such as total cost or net cost (expenses less revenues or expenditure less receipts). In a cash accounting environment, total expenditures is often used as a benchmark.
