= Engagement letter =

An engagement letter defines the legal relationship (or engagement) between a professional firm (e.g., law, investment banking, consulting, advisory or accountancy firm) and its client(s). This letter states the terms and conditions of the engagement, principally addressing the scope of the engagement and the terms of compensation for the firm. The independence of the auditor or accountant is stressed in such a letter. The Institute of Chartered Accountants in England and Wales provides guidance on letters of engagement for the accounting profession.

== Standard format for letters of engagement ==
Most engagement letters follow a standard format. The example given below refers to the engagement of an accountancy firm.

- Addressee: typically letters are addressed to the senior management (e.g. CEO) of the client.
- Identification of the service to be rendered: one type of service is a financial statement audit. Provided in this section is a brief description of the nature of the particular service. Other services that are planned for the audit (e.g. evaluation of internal control, preparation of regulatory reports) are also identified in this section.
- Specification of the responsibilities of the auditor of the company: This section refers to the specific professional standards and responsibilities of the auditor.
- Constraints on the accounting firm, such as the timing of access to client facilities and accounting records may delay the engagement.
- Deadlines, including the estimated date of completion and release of the financial statements, as well as the general guidelines for the timing of the audit work.
- Description of any assistance to be provided by the client: typically, the client's personnel will prepare some schedules (e.g. bank reconciliations) and retrieve documents from files. The letter should describe the assistance of client personnel. If the assistance is not provided and the auditors must complete the work themselves, this section of the letter would provide justification for additional fees to the client.
- Interactions with specialists, internal auditors, and the predecessor auditor needed to conduct the audit: Some specialists needed on an audit may include engineers to verify the stage of completion of electronic components, real estate appraisers to appraise realizable value of real estate used as collateral for loans, actuaries to evaluate the funding requirements and future cash flows associated with pensions or post-retirement health costs, and attorneys to evaluate the likely disposition of contingent losses arising from litigation.
- A disclaimer, describing the limits of the audit. Typically this expresses that an audit is not designed to detect all forms of fraud or illegal acts; rather, an audit checks the financial position of a client with reference to generally accepted accounting principles.
- A description of the basis for fees, which may include a fixed fee or an estimate of fees based on expected completion time and billing rates of firm employees assigned to the engagement.
- Ownership and accessibility of the auditor's files to external parties.

== See also ==
- List of auditing topics
