= Inherent risk =

Unmitigated Risk

Inherent risk, in risk management, is an assessed level of raw or untreated risk; that is, the natural level of risk inherent in a process or activity without doing anything to reduce the likelihood or mitigate the severity of a mishap, or the amount of risk before the application of the risk reduction effects of controls. Another definition is that inherent risk is the current risk level given the existing set of controls, which may be incomplete or less than ideal, rather than an absence of any controls.

Strategic Risk involves risks that affect the organization’s ability to achieve its goals and objectives. Inherent strategic risks could stem from changes in the business environment, competitive pressures, or shifts in consumer preferences.

Operational Risk are risks associated with the day-to-day operations of an organization. Inherent operational risks can arise from internal processes, people, systems, or external events that disrupt operations.

Financial Risk includes risks related to the financial health and stability of an organization. Inherent financial risks might involve market fluctuations, credit risks, liquidity issues, and investment uncertainties.

Compliance Risk are related to adherence to laws, regulations, and policies. Inherent compliance risks occur when regulatory landscapes change or when new regulations are introduced.

Reputational Risk pertains to risks that affect the public perception and image of an organization. Inherent reputational risks can be triggered by negative publicity, social media activity, or other factors that impact public opinion.

Inherent risk is contrasted with residual risk, which is the amount of risk left after treatment and added security measures.

== See also ==
- Inherent risk (accounting), particularly, the consideration of the probability of material misstatements in financial records
