= Audit evidence =

Evidence that auditors use to verify accuracy

Audit evidence is evidence obtained by auditors during a financial audit and recorded in the audit working papers.

Audit evidence is required by auditors to determine if a company has correct information considering their financial statements. If the information is correct, a CPA (Certified Public Accountant) can confirm the company's financial statements. Audit evidence is the primary support for an auditor's opinion on if there is a reasonable assurance that the company's financial statements are not materially misstated due to fraud or error. Audit evidence consists of various audit procedures and can often have a different role in the different stages of an audit. Audit evidence must be sufficient and appropriate, which means it is reliable and relevant. The auditor must use their own professional judgement when determining if the audit evidence is persuasive and sufficient.

Audit evidence has undergone significant change with the emergence of Artificial Intelligence, Big Data, and audit data analytics. As the field of accounting is transforming, technologies such as AI (artificial intelligence) are playing a role in audit evidence. AI is enhancing the collection of audit evidence due to the large quantities of data that can be processed with very little error. Audit evidence collection is also being improved through audit data analytics, which also provide the auditor the ability to view the entire population of data, rather than just a sample. Viewing greater amounts of data leads to a more efficient audit and a greater understanding of the audit evidence.

Along with audit data analytics, big data has allowed auditors to use more sources for audit evidence and helps increase the quality and efficiency of audits. Alternatively, the quality of the data in these new sources can not always be seen as reliable, which can be a drawback to big data’s contributions.

== Audit procedures ==
The Public Company Accounting Oversight Board (PCAOB) describes the procedures used to get audit evidence. This includes inspection, observation, inquiry, confirmation, recalculation, reperformance, and analytical procedures.

- Inspection occurs when the auditor check's the clients records for important evidence. These records can be from the client, or from outside companies giving information about the client.
- Observation is when the auditor watches someone do a specific job, such as watching an employee count products in a warehouse. The evidence gathered in an observation usually applies to that date. This means an inventory observation on December 31 demonstrates the amount of inventory the company has on that date.
- Inquiry involves speaking to people, whether inside or outside the client's company, to learn specific information.
- Confirmation is a response to the auditor from third party roles about information regarding an assertion.
- Recalculation is when the auditor checks if mathematical procedures are correct, such as re-adding totals.
- Reperformance occurs when the auditor redoes certain processes to ensure they were done correctly.
- Analytical Procedures are done to check unexpected variances and investigate financial and non-financial information.

== Audit evidence through Audit stages ==
Audit evidence plays a role in each phase of the audit. In the acceptance and continuance phase, audit evidence is the information the auditor considers before making their decision. Some examples of this are the competency and capability of the audit team, integrity of key employees in the client company, if relevant ethical requirements are able to be met, and any other implications that will affect the completion of the audit. In the audit planning stage, audit evidence is the information that the auditor considers when determining the most effective and efficient approach for the audit. For example, reliability of internal control procedures, and analytical review systems. In the control testing stage, audit evidence is used by the auditor to consider the mix of audit test of controls and audit substantive tests. In the substantive testing stage, audit evidence is defined as the information that the auditor needs to support the appropriation of financial statement assertions. Finally in the conclusion and opinion formulation stage, audit evidence is the information considered by the auditor before determining whether the financial statements as a whole present with completeness, validity, accuracy, and consistency with the auditor's understanding of the entity.

== Qualities of acceptable audit evidence ==
There are a couple aspects of evidence that make various audit evidence good quality. This consists of sufficiency and appropriateness. Audit evidence is sufficient when there is an acceptable amount of evidence found. This changes based on the risk of material misstatement and the quality of evidence that was found. The higher the risk that the financial statements are materially misstated, the more evidence an auditor should collect. The better a specific piece of evidence is, the less an auditor needs to find additional evidence.

For audit evidence to be appropriate, it needs to be relevant and reliable. It is relevant when it is heavily related to the assertion or control that is being tested. The audit’s design can change the level of relevancy. This includes whether they are testing the identified assertion or control or they are testing materiality of statement differences. Next, reliability is decided based on where the evidence came from and what happened to obtain it. Evidence obtained externally from an expert or professional that is unrelated to the client has a high level of reliability compared to evidence from within the client’s company. The reliability of internal evidence can be improved by ensuring that the company’s internal controls are functioning properly. Another very reliable form of evidence is direct knowledge, which means the auditor learned this information directly.

== Effect of technology on audit evidence ==
The collection of audit evidence has transformed with the use of artificial intelligence (AI). This new technology allows auditors to examine large quantities of evidence efficiently, allowing auditor's to quickly determine the validity of the audit evidence they are examining. Due to the fact that large quantities of data can be collected and condensed, auditors can use the information from AI to make more efficient decisions throughout the audit. Additionally, AI can be programmed to find certain things such as material misstatements, and can identify these mistakes in less time than humans. Technology is capable of reformatting different pieces of audit evidence so that it is comparable with other evidence that has been found, improving the auditor's efficiency. AI that is properly functioning and maintained can also reduce substantive testing of audit evidence, which will reduce the time of the audit.

While AI can make the auditing process easier, there are concerns that AI will dismiss audit evidence that humans would not have overlooked due to immateriality. Currently, many auditors that use AI are utilizing its abilities to analyze evidence efficiently, but are still depending on human judgment and professional skepticism. The technology of AI is still relatively new, meaning that a lot of training still needs to be done before auditors worldwide can use this application.

== Big data and audit evidence ==
Audit technology has allowed auditors to acquire audit evidence from multiple sources, both financial and non-financial. Technology that works with big data can work alongside audit evidence to increase the quality and efficiency of an audit. Big data uses pattern recognition, natural-language processing, and data mining to elevate audit data analytics, which is briefly discussed in the paragraph below. Additionally, big data is characterized by its size, velocity, veracity, and variety. These characteristics allow big data to contribute to the sufficiency and relevancy of audit evidence. Big data is an external source obtained directly by the auditor, and therefore, can increase reliability of the audit evidence. Since it is real-time data from external sources and is so large, it is more difficult for an individual to tamper with, increasing the reliability. If an auditor is having difficulties retrieving clients' information, using big data can serve as an alternative way to obtain relevant information for the audit or can be used in conjunction with existing evidence as a supplement.

On the other hand, big data could have some drawbacks. There are some concerns regarding the data quality you get with big data due to the possibility of increased false positives, which would decrease reliability. Additionally, big data evidence can be an indicator of association, but can be misinterpreted as causation, which could lead to inaccurate conclusions. As for challenges auditors would face, one would be linking the big data with the relevant, traditional audit evidence in order to complement it. Another challenge would involve efficiently and accurately sorting and summarizing the large volume of data, which can be achieved through the use of data mining if done successfully. Some sources of big data may come from outlets such as news articles or social media, which could be influenced by biases and make the evidence inappropriate to use as representative of the population.

== Audit data analytics ==
Rather than replacing or eliminating traditional audit techniques completely, audit data analytics can be used alongside the traditional methods to optimize the sufficiency and relevance of audit evidence. Audit data analytics allows auditors to look at an entire population rather than just a sample, which can help the audit by providing more assurance to the auditor and provide higher quality audit evidence. This complete testing can make the evidence more accurate. Audit data analytics can also provide the auditor with a greater understanding of the evidence, leading to more informed decisions. The audit data analytics process may take some years to become fully functioning. In the first year, the company must find the appropriate data set, and the auditor must perform data wrangling on that data set in order for analytics procedures to be carried out. In this case, data wrangling refers to when an auditor reconciles and formats a data set. This process performed in the first year will require extra time added to the traditional audit, so it may initially take longer than sampling.

Additionally, audit data analytics can assist with an auditor's risk assessment; the auditor can identify the company's trends and compare them to the industry norms using this technology. If the auditor finds an unusual difference or discrepancy, they can investigate it further. More specifically, the planning stage can be improved by the auditors using the technology to enhance their understanding of the company and its industry. Data analytics can also provide a thorough, detailed analysis of a company's general ledger or sub ledgers, which can provide more evidence to the auditor.

In relation to specific kinds of audit evidence, there are a couple examples where audit data analytics can alter the methods of collection. Traditionally, bank confirmations, analytical procedures, and journal entry testing would most likely be carried out at the client site by the audit team itself. With the use of this technology, these kinds of procedures could be handed off to other groups to be completed remotely (specialists, third parties) rather than having to personally travel to the sites.

With the emergence and growing popularity of audit data analytics, the accounting profession is tasked with evolving its auditing standards to encompass the usage of data analytics technology, big data, and “continuous auditing.”

== See also ==
- International Standards on Auditing
- ISA 500 Audit Evidence
- HKSA 500 Audit Evidence
- Financial statement assertions
