= Management assertions =

Term used in financial auditing

Management assertions or financial statement assertions are the implicit or explicit assertions that the preparer of financial statements (management) is making to its users. These assertions are relevant to auditors performing a financial statement audit in two ways. First, the objective of a financial statement audit is to obtain sufficient appropriate audit evidence to conclude on whether the financial statements present fairly, in all material respects, the financial position of a company and the results of its operations and cash flows. In developing that conclusion, the auditor evaluates whether audit evidence corroborates or contradicts financial statement assertions. Second, auditors are required to consider the risk of material misstatement through understanding the entity and its environment, including the entity's internal control. Financial statement assertions provide a framework to assess the risk of material misstatement in each significant account balance or class of transactions.

Both United States and International auditing standards include guidance related to financial statement assertions, although the specific assertions differ. The PCAOB and the IFAC address this topic in AS 1105 (updated from AS 15 as of December 31, 2016) and ISA 315, respectively. The American Institute of Certified Public Accountants identifies the following financial statement assertions:

1. Transactions and events
  - Occurrence — the transactions recorded have actually taken place.
  - Completeness — all transactions that should have been recorded have been recorded.
  - Accuracy — the transactions were recorded at the appropriate amounts.
  - Cutoff — the transactions have been recorded in the correct accounting period.
  - Classification — the transactions have been recorded in the appropriate caption.
2. Accounts balances as of period end
  - Existence — assets, liabilities and equity balances exist.
  - Rights and Obligations — the entity legally controls rights to its assets and its liabilities faithfully represent its obligations.
  - Completeness — all balances that should have been recorded have been recorded.
  - Valuation and Allocation — balances that are included in the financial statements are appropriately valued and allocation adjustments are appropriately recorded.
3. Presentation and disclosure
  - Occurrence — the transactions and disclosures have actually occurred.
  - Rights and Obligations — the transactions and disclosures pertain to the entity.
  - Completeness — all disclosures have been included in the financial statements.
  - Classification — financial statements are clear and appropriately presented.
  - Accuracy and Valuation — information is disclosed at the appropriate amounts.
