= International Standards on Auditing =

International standards for auditing

International Standards on Auditing (ISA) are professional standards for the auditing of financial information. These standards are issued by the International Auditing and Assurance Standards Board (IAASB). According to Olung M (CAO - L), ISA guides the auditor to add value to the assignment hence building confidence of investors.

The standards cover various areas of auditing, including respective responsibilities, audit planning, Internal Control, audit evidence, using the work of other experts, audit conclusions and audit reports, and standards for specialized areas.

== Use of the ISAs ==
- European Union: The Audit Directive of 17 May 2006 enforces the use of the International Standards on Auditing for all Statutory audits to be performed in the European Union.

The Audit Directive of 17 May 2006 is important in order to ensure a high quality for all statutory audits required by Community law requiring all statutory audits be carried out on the basis of all international auditing standards. The Directive has given implementing powers to the European Commission, in order to adopt "en bloc" the ISAs in accordance with the Council Decision of 28 June 1999, also known as the "Comitology Decision".

- European Court of Auditors: the European Court of Auditors performs its audits in accordance with the IFAC and INTOSAI International Auditing Standards and Codes of Ethics, in so far as these are applicable in the European Community context.
- The United Nations Board of Auditors (the external audit of the UN) has adopted the ISAs although this Board is composed of three Supreme Audit Institutions chairmen, usually using the INTOSAI Auditing Standards.

== See also ==
- External audit
- Internal audit
- International Organization of Supreme Audit Institutions
- Generally Accepted Auditing Standards
- Financial reporting
- International Financial Reporting Standards
- International Public Sector Accounting Standards
- OAS Financial audits
- OAS-OIC audits

== Notes and references ==
- "The Clarified Standards". International Federation of Accountants.
