= Risk-based approach to EMC regulation and standardization =

Standard for electrical and electronic devices

The risk-based approach is an enhanced system of the regulation and standardization of Electromagnetic compatibility (EMC) in electronic devices before their commercialization. EMC is essential for ensuring the safety, performance, and quality of electronic devices. However, achieving and maintaining EMC presents a significant challenge due to the rapid development of new products with evolving technologies and features.

It is often assumed that if a device meets the electromagnetic emission and immunity levels defined by the EMC standards, it has been tested against worst-case electromagnetic disturbance phenomena. However, this is usually not the case, and devices frequently face more severe electromagnetic environments than anticipated in real life and malfunction. Additionally, product technology can evolve faster than EMC standards and therefore, relying solely on immunity testing is no longer sufficient to ensure EMC.

While conventional testing methods specified in EMC standards are essential for assessing the EM immunity of electrical and electronic equipment, they are often inadequate for ensuring safety-critical systems will maintain acceptable failure levels throughout their entire expected lifecycle.

In fields such as transportation, medicine, and defense, technological advancements have led to the integration of sophisticated features into a wide range of complex systems, which are more electrified, connected, and automated than their predecessors, resulting in increased complexity and a lack of comprehensive system understanding. Achieving EMC is essential for these systems to prevent potential hazards hazards caused by electromagnetic interference (EMI) that could compromise safety, security, and reliability. Many EMC experts and scientists argue that the current rule-based EMC testing approach is insufficient for addressing these challenges. Some of the reasons include:

- Only one EM disturbance is tested at a time
- Normal EMC test methods are designed for accuracy and repeatability, and not to simulate real life
- The effects of the physical environment are not considered by normal EMC testing
- Ageing is not considered by normal immunity testing
- The maximum test level is not necessarily the worst

These are just a few reasons why the current rule-based approach, which mandates compliance with relevant EMC standards and regulations, may be inadequate for complex systems. In addition to potentially compromising system attributes like safety and security, this approach can lead to financial losses due to launch delays caused by EMC issues identified later in the development process. However, due to budget constraints on money, time, and equipment for testing immunity and emissions, it is impractical to conduct more extensive testing than what is currently done by system manufacturers and component suppliers. Therefore, in addition to complying with existing standards, it is crucial to perform a comprehensive risk assessment and implement risk mitigation measures to prevent unacceptable consequences for stakeholders.

The European Commission has recognized that many companies only meet the minimum requirements of harmonized standards to demonstrate EMC compliance. This prompted the release of the Blue Guide, the RED Guide, and most recently, the Guide for the EMC Directive, all of which emphasize a risk-based approach. The key points related to this "risk-based approach" outlined in these guides can be summarized as follows:

- Harmonized standards do not replace legally binding essential requirements
- Even when using harmonized standards, the manufacturer remains fully responsible for assessing the risks associated with their product
- Conformity assessment requires technical documentation and must include a thorough risk analysis
- The EMC assessment must consider all normal intended operating conditions and configurations of the equipment.

The challenges involved in implementing a risk-based approach should not be underestimated. Traditionally, each device was assessed individually, with the goal of ensuring its own protection against EMI using arbitrary sets of standardized values as a reference. However, the design philosophy has fundamentally shifted towards considering scenarios that ensure a device functions safely within its intended electromagnetic environment throughout its lifetime. This approach requires considering every possible interaction with other devices across various settings. The change goes beyond merely re-enforcing existing EMI protections; it involves understanding new electromagnetic environments of use, adapting to them, and inventing protective solutions to address emerging EMI issues, all while maintaining the key design characteristics of the device. It also focuses on ensuring long-term resilience and reliability in face of the constantly changing and increasingly complex EMI scenarios. Given these factors, the "risk-based approach" should be the default practice.

== Medical device risk management concepts ==
The law demands a risk-based approach rather than the conventional, rule-based approach. The EMCD (the EMC directive - the law) and the Blue Guide, which covers the implementation of EU product rules, require an EMI risk-based approach for any new equipment. Similarly, the specific regulations for medical equipment (MDR and IEC 60601-1-2) also refer to a risk-based approach. The Medical Device Regulation (MDR) 2017/745 outlines General Safety and Performance Requirements (GSPR) that medical device manufacturers must meet. Anned I of the MDR specifies EMC-related GSPR in Articles 14.2(b), 18.5, 18.6, and 23.4(s). These requirements ensure that medical devices remain safe and effective in the presence of EMI risks caused by electromagnetic disturbances. Ultimately, regulatory bodies review and confirm that EMC-related GSPR continue to perform satisfactorily, ensuring the safety and effectiveness of medical devices.

Medical device EMC risk management includes various key terms such as electromagnetic disturbances, electromagnetic compatibility, EM environment, EM emission, Immunity (to a disturbance), risk, hazard, harm, hazardous situation, risk analysis, risk evaluation, risk control, residual risk, basic safety, essential performance, severity, risk management file, intended use, benefit, etc.

== Related European Research projects ==
There are several ongoing European research projects focusing on the risk management of EMI, such as PETER (Pan-European Training, Research, and Education Network on Electromagnetic Risk Management) and ETERNITY.

The ETERNITY project, which stands for European Training Network on Electromagnetic Risks in Medical Technology, is a European-funded Marie Skłodowska-Curie project involving partners from Belgium, Portugal, Spain, and The Netherlands. ETERNITY specifically addresses the implementation of risk-based EMC within the medical domain, investigating the impact of EMI and EMC issues on safety-critical medical devices. The project's primary objective is to develop a risk-based approach to mitigate the adverse effects of EMI on the operation of medical systems.

ETERNITY encompasses 14 individual projects, each assigned to an Early -Stage Researcher (ESR), contributing to one or more work packages (WPs). Each ESR's research is designed as a standalone contribution, with planned collaboration points to integrate complementary results and add extra value to the project. Through this project, the selected ESRs have received advanced research training on the technical aspects of EMI/EMC and how to tackle EMI challenges in medical contexts. The academic and industrial partners involved bring strong expertise in this field, and the recruited researchers have demonstrated strong backgrounds, motivation, and commitment to the project's success.

== Steps in Risk-based EMC in medical technology ==
ISO14971's risk management steps for medical device

The European Medical Device Regulation (MDR 2017/745) and the medical EMC collateral standard (IEC 60601-1-2) are built on a legal foundation that specifies a risk-based approach, as outlined by the risk management standard ISO14971. The ISO14971 risk-based EMC approach has also been incorporated into the ETERNITY project.

=== Risk management plan ===
The risk management plan (RMP) establishes the context for the risk management process and is the first step. The RMP should be documented by the MD manufacturer and includes a detailed plan of all activities, assigning responsibility for each task. It also outlines criteria for risk acceptability based on the manufacturer's policy, monitoring methods to evaluate performance criteria, details for verifying the implementation and effectiveness of risk control measures, and activities related to the production and post-production information.

=== Risk assessment ===
The risk assessment process involves the following elements:

- Risk analysis – The EMC risk analysis begins with an understanding of the intended use, operating environment, foreseeable misuse, and safety characteristics of the medical device. This step involves identifying and analyzing known and foreseeable electromagnetic disturbance hazards. In the context of EM risk analysis, electromagnetic phenomena serve as the initial event or cause, which can then trigger subsequent events, potentially leading to a chain reaction.
- Risk estimation - After analyzing the risks, the next step is to estimate them based on the probability of occurrence of harm and the severity of that harm. Risk estimation is associated with each hazardous situation and its linked risks. The categories for probability and severity can be defined in the RM policy or plan. If the EMI risk is deemed unacceptable, cross-functional experts from medical, EMC, and other relevant domains are involved to assess its severity.
- Risk evaluation - During risk estimation, the manufacturer assesses each risk individually and categorizes them as acceptable or unacceptable using a risk matrix. The acceptability of each risk is determined according to the risk acceptability criteria outlined in the risk management plan.

=== Risk control ===
When risks are deemed unacceptable, it is mandatory to implement risk control measures (RCM) to mitigate them. RCMs are designed to prevent the occurrence of events that could lead to hazardous situations or, ultimately, harm. According to the ISO 14971 risk management standard, manufacturers should select appropriate RCMs in the following order of priority:

- Inherently safe design and manufacturing
- Implement protective measures in the design or manufacturing process
- Provide information for safety and the appropriate training

=== Overall residual risk evaluation ===
In the initial steps of the risk management process—risk analysis, risk estimation, and risk control—risks are assessed and managed individually. However, in real-life scenarios, multiple less severe risks can combine to create a more severe risk. Therefore, it is essential to adopt an overall risk perspective for the whole medical device. Risk evaluation involves assessing each individual risk against the risk acceptability criteria defined in the risk management plan.

=== Risk management report review ===
- Risk management file (RMF)
- EMC risk management file (EMC RMF)
- Risk management review (RMR)

Above state-of-the-art risk management steps are integrated and interrelated among individual ESR projects, and their corresponding core WP are described below.

== Risk-based EMC implementation within European ETERNITY project ==
Risk-based EMC implementation work packages within ETERNITY project

=== Electromagnetic Risk Identification (ETERNITY Work Package 1) ===
ETERNITY WP1 of electromagnetic risk identification focuses on the left part of the risk-based approach's V-model, i.e., the identification of EMI-related risks and their criticality. The goal is to characterize the EMI-related risks stemming from the operating electromagnetic environment and/or the susceptibility of the medical system under development. No risk analysis methods have yet been developed to cover EMI issues, so it is necessary to choose the methods to use and adapt them to deal with EMI. Successful adaptation requires competency, skills, and expertise in both safety engineering and real-life EMI, and not just EMC testing. ESR 1 to 3 are involved in EMI risk identification.

ESR 1 is exploring the feasibility of using a footprint to forecast and reduce unwanted electromagnetic radiation in medical applications, focusing on real-life scenarios over standardized measurements for enhanced safety. This research is expected to have a positive socio-economic impact by increasing awareness of risk-based product rules, which differentiate from traditional rule-based standards.

Risk assessment by ESR1 - the characterization of noise sources and their intertwined paths of propagation

ESR2 is exploring the integration of digital communication systems (DCS) within the medical field and its associated potential EMI issues. This investigation will analyze the impact on both patients and medical devices when exposed to intentional or unintentional EMI, utilizing machine learning techniques. The expected socio-economic impact from these findings includes the development of new methodologies and evaluation techniques for assessing DCS-EMC effectiveness using established benchmarks and directives.

Risk assessment by ESR2 - Distribution of EMI Sources and Sensitive Entities in an Open Hospital Room Environment

The research performed by ESR3 aims to enhance EMI risk assessment in medical systems using a systems thinking approach. EMI is considered a causal factor for unsafe control actions leading to accidents. The new methodology will improve safety and reliability in critical infrastructure by identifying previously unrecognized EMI hazards and risks, enabling more effective mitigation strategies, and reducing the likelihood of catastrophic failures in the medical field.

Risk assessment by ESR3 - Proposed methodology for EM-hazards identification based on STPA

=== Electromagnetic Risk Reduction Methodologies (ETERNITY Work Package 2) ===
ETERNITY WP2 focuses on electromagnetic Risk-Reduction Methodologies that effectively reduce the EMI risks (identified with the methods of WP1) to the level that they are acceptable for safety. Methodologies in hardware, middleware and software are considered.

The main objective of the research performed by ESR4 consists of developing an EMI-aware design process, starting from the risk and hazard analyses of the medical system under development in its operational electromagnetic environment. This will translate into EMI-risk-reduction method as a social impact and in easy-to-apply and cost-effective technique as an economic impact.

The work by ESR5 aims to improve the resilience of healthcare digital communication links against EMI by utilizing time-domain mitigation techniques. It examines how electromagnetic disturbances affect these links to enhance the reliability and robustness of medical devices and systems, thereby improving patient safety and care.

Risk reduction method by ESR5 - EM resilient communication system

ESR6 is implementing a multi-layer coding technique in communication networks of safety-critical systems, reducing risks in medical system of systems. This methodology enhances network resilience, reduces safety risks, and ensures reliable transmission of critical information, offering industries a way to upgrade systems with advanced mitigation techniques for improved safety and reliability.

Risk reduction by ESR6 through multi-layer coding technique

=== Evaluation, Validation & Verification Methodologies (ETERNITY Work Package 3) ===
ETERNITY WP3 focuses on residual risk evaluation through verification and validation methodologies and that completes the risk-based approach's V-cycle and targets novel methodologies to verify, validate and argument that the applied risk-reduction (WP2) effectively addresses the identified risks (WP1) over the full lifecycle.

ESR7 aims to provide insights into an alternative methodology that will aid in the process of risk assessment. The primary objective is to propose an alternative method that enables manufacturers and hospital managers, among others, to conduct risk testing. The proposed methodology will lead to facilitating the application of the risk-based approach for both manufacturers and hospital managers.

Overall residual risk evaluation method proposed by ESR7

The research conducted by ESR8 aims to develop an approach for including digital communication signals and multiple interference sources in EMC immunity tests for medical devices. By better assessing and controlling EMI risks, this method will advance radiated immunity test assessment, improve risk control, and address issues from medical device malfunctions caused by inadequate EM assessment. A validation method for EMC immunity tests, considering the complex EM environment in medical scenarios, is proposed.

Overall residual risk evaluation method proposed by ESR8

Upon completing ESR9's research, an EMI sensor will be integrated into an electronic device to continuously monitor potential EMD. This will improve the safety and reliability of medical devices and enhance the sustainability of electronic products. The enhanced EMI sensors can prevent disruptions in critical medical equipment, thereby maintaining device functionality and ensuring a high level of operational integrity.

Overall residual risk evaluation by ESR9 - SDR based detector

=== Case studies that applied Risk-based EMC approach (ETERNITY Work Package 4) ===
ETERNITY WP4 pilots ETERNITY's risk-based EMC approach, combining the previous 3 WPs. In total, 4 ESRs are working on case studies covering the full design cycle from early concept to final certification, in 4 different medical environments (hospitals, homecare, transportation, and "special environment" in which medical imaging and treatment systems operate).

Upon completing the research, ESR10 will introduce novel testing methodologies for the life cycles of complex medical systems, such as Magnetic Resonance Imaging (MRI) systems, enhancing their resilience and improving patient safety.The research will address the oversimplification of EMI risk management in MRI systems by proposing a modular approach. Additionally, it will identify the usefulness of reverberation measurement techniques to design more representative EMC test setups.

Risk-based EMC within MRI system case study by ESR10

ESR 11's research will develop key tools for risk-based EMC, prioritizing higher and more relevant risks and optimizing the use of limited resources. This will lead to more accessible and affordable healthcare, and support the creation of more reliable, resilient, effective, and safer medical equipment. ESR 11 has proposed a clinical workflow-oriented EMI risk management framework and a unified risk-based EMC approach, along with tools for risk assessment, risk review, and EMD characterization.

Pillars of clinical workflow-oriented risk-based EMC approach

The aim of the research performed by ESR12 is to evaluate the EM performance of monitoring systems in all operating conditions throughout their life cycle, not just in controlled laboratory settings, thereby supporting the risk-based approach to EMI. The proposed methodology will be crucial for future driver-monitoring systems, enhancing risk assessment and improving overall safety.

Case study of driver-monitoring systems to improve risk assessment by ESR12

By the end of the ESR13 research, a set of guidelines for EMC-aware design in Small and medium-sized enterprises (SMEs) will be available, reducing time-to-market and associated costs for new products.

Risk-based EMC applied on Biomedical case study by ESR13

ESR14's research focuses on using graphical representation to improve understanding of how to protect medical devices from EMI. This enhances risk management, resilience design, and regulatory EMC compliance. The research aims to increase trust in medical devices' safety and effectiveness against EMI, positively impacting society. It will also reduce the economic impact of EMC risks by presenting a unified EMC assurance case, arguing for risk identification, analysis, mitigation, resilience, and compliance with standards such as IEC 60601-1-2 and IEC TS 60601-4-2.

Risk management report documentation approach through risk-resilience-compliance by ESR14

Medical device EMC compliance documentation approach using unified EMC assurance case by ESR14
