= Bow tie (disambiguation) =

A bow tie is a fashion accessory, popularly worn with other formal attire.

Bow tie, Bowtie, or Bow-tie may also refer to:

== Places ==
- Bow Tie Nebula, another name for the Boomerang Nebula in the constellation Centaurus
- Bow-Tie Nebula, another name for NGC 40 (C2) in the constellation Cepheus

== People ==
- Donald Tsang, nicknamed "Bow-tie Tsang", the second Chief Executive in Hong Kong SAR, China

== Arts, entertainment, and media ==
- Bow Tie killer, a character in the Problem Child (1990 film)
- Bow ties are cool, a reference to The Eleventh Doctor in the Doctor Who series
- "Bowtie", a song by OutKast from their 2003 album Speakerboxxx/The Love Below

== Brands and enterprises ==
- Bow Tie Cinemas
- Bow-tie, a brand name of polarization-maintaining optical fiber
- BowTie Inc., a magazine and book publisher

== Mathematics ==
- Bow tie angle, an angle in geometry
- Bowtie stub, a radial stub
- Bowtie-quadrilateral, a geometric structure
- ⋈, the symbol used for the natural join operator of relational algebra

== Science and technology ==
- Bow tie (biology), a common organizational architecture in biological and other self-organizing systems
- Bowtie (sequence analysis), ultrafast, memory-efficient short aligner for short DNA sequences
- Bowtie, a type of architecture in load balancing (computing)
- Bowtie array, a reflective array antenna
- Bowtie cotter pin, a formed wire fastener that resembles an R-clip, except it positively locks when installed
- Bowtie turtle, a Philippine forest turtle

== Other uses ==
- Bowtie (road), a type of road junction
- Bow-tie diagrams, used in risk management and network theory
- Bowtie inversion, one of many types of roller coaster inversions
- Bowtie pasta, another name for farfalle
