= Africa Stop Ebola =

2014 charity single

Single by Collectif Africa Stop Ebola
- Released: 5 October 2014
- Recorded: 2014
- Studio: Studios in Paris, Bamako, and Conakry; mixed in London
- Genre: Reggae; World music; Hip hop
- Label: Universal Music Division Barclay
- Songwriters: Kandia Kouyaté; Sékou Kouyaté; Tiken Jah Fakoly; Amadou & Mariam; Salif Keita; Oumou Sangaré; Mory Kanté; Sia Tolno; Barbara Kanam; Didier Awadi; Mokobé; Marcus; Konkon Malela; Carlos Chirinos
- Producers: Valérie Malot; Carlos Chirinos; 3D Family

"Africa Stop Ebola" is a 2014 pan-African charity single created by a collective of West and Central African musicians to raise awareness about the Western African Ebola outbreak and to fund relief efforts by Médecins Sans Frontières (MSF). The single was launched on 5 October 2014 and produced by the French company 3D Family, with all proceeds going to MSF. The song is widely regarded as the African response to the British charity single "Do They Know It's Christmas?" by Band Aid 30, released the same year.

== Background ==
The 2014 Ebola virus epidemic — the largest in recorded history at the time – devastated Guinea, Liberia, and Sierra Leone. The virus had infected over 15,000 people in the region since it was first reported in Guinea in March 2014, according to the World Health Organization.

Tiken Jah Fakoly, a renowned Ivorian reggae musician who rallied other artists to raise awareness about Ebola, said he was moved by television images of people in quarantine in the worst-affected countries. "When I saw those terrible images, I called the other musicians and said that we have to do something to sensitize the people about this disease," Fakoly told the Thomson Reuters Foundation.

West African governments and international non-governmental organizations (NGOs) had expended significant resources trying to educate their populations about the disease, often with limited success, in part due to widespread mistrust of official institutions. Fakoly noted that musicians could reach audiences that politicians and public health officials could not, observing: "People listen to us more than to their politicians."

== Production ==
The song was written by Kandia Kouyaté (also credited as Kandia Kora) and fellow Guinean musician Sékou Kouyaté, with additional lyrical contributions from the performing artists and co-writer Carlos Chirinos. After the song was conceived, Tiken Jah Fakoly began recruiting West African artists to lend their voices. The song took about a month to assemble.

=== Production credits ===
The project was executive-produced by Valérie Malot, Artistic Director of the Paris-based music agency 3D Family, who oversaw the campaign from recording through distribution. The song was distributed to radio stations across Africa through the World Association of Community Radio Broadcasters (AMARC), and the accompanying music video was broadcast on television stations in Europe and across Africa.

Carlos Chirinos, Professor of Music Business and Health promotion at NYU Steinhardt School of Culture, Education, and Human Development, served as co-producer, lyrics co-writer, and architect of the project's participatory public health strategy. A specialist in music, media, and social development with experience leading music-based health campaigns across Africa – supported by the World Bank, IDRC, DFID, and the Wellcome Trust — Chirinos co-wrote the lyrics with the performing artists, co-produced the recording, and designed the participatory health promotion strategy deployed both online and on the ground in Guinea.

=== Recording and post-production ===
The song was recorded across multiple cities to accommodate the geographically dispersed cast of artists. Recording sessions took place in studios in Paris, Bamako, and Conakry. The recorded material was subsequently edited and mixed in London by bassist and producer Leon Brichard and Carlos Chirinos.

=== Featured artists ===
The collective of featured artists includes:

- Tiken Jah Fakoly (Côte d'Ivoire) — vocals
- Amadou & Mariam (Mali) — vocals
- Salif Keita (Mali) — vocals
- Oumou Sangaré (Mali) — vocals
- Kandia Kouyaté (Guinea) — vocals
- Mory Kanté (Guinea) — vocals
- Sia Tolno (Guinea) — vocals
- Barbara Kanam (Democratic Republic of the Congo) — vocals
- Didier Awadi (Senegal) — rap
- Mokobé (Mali) — rap
- Marcus, from the group Banlieuz'Arts – rap
- Konkon Malela (Guinea) — rap
- Sékou Kouyaté (Guinea) — electric guitar, bass, electric kora
- Ludovic N'Holle – drums
- Cheick Tidiane Seck – arranger and multi-instrumentalist

=== Musical style and languages ===
The song is a reggae-infused ballad that opens with a passage sung by Kandia Kouyaté, before the full ensemble joins on the refrain "Ebola, ebola, invisible enemy." Mory Kanté shifts the song's momentum toward younger audiences before rappers Didier Awadi, Konkon Malela, and Mokobé give it a closing urgency.

The song is performed in French, Bambara, Soussou, Malinké, Kissi, and Lingala, ensuring the message could be understood across communities with varying levels of literacy.

== Public health messaging ==
The song urges listeners to trust doctors, wash their hands, avoid physical contact with others, and refrain from touching the bodies of the deceased – all key behaviours in halting Ebola transmission. It also works to counter the stigma faced by Ebola survivors and to dispel dangerous myths about the virus circulating in affected communities.

Chirinos explained the rationale for using music as a vehicle: "Music and radio are critical because music is education and entertainment. You don't have to know how to read or write in order to understand what a song says."

Guinean singer Mory Kanté elaborated: "We need the information to reach everywhere because I think that art and culture is the shortest route to communicate with these villagers so that they understand the importance of being able to avoid this scourge."

== Release and commercial performance ==
The single was released on 5 October 2014 through Universal Music Division Barclay. An unofficial release at the start of November preceded a formal campaign launched later that month. According to producers 3D Family, the song sold 250,000 copies since its informal release, with all proceeds going to Médecins Sans Frontières.

The official launch in late November 2014 marked the beginning of a December campaign using merchandise including T-shirts, flyers, posters, a music video with English subtitles, and a social media campaign. The song was distributed to radio and television stations throughout West Africa via AMARC, and the hashtag #AfricaStopEbola became one of the top 15 trending topics in Africa in 2014.

The initiative received support from international figures including Bono, Peter Gabriel, and Samantha Power, then serving as the United States Ambassador to the United Nations.

== Reception ==
=== Critical reception ===
Afropop Worldwide described "Africa Stop Ebola" as "perhaps the most remarkable Ebola song," praising it as "a masterpiece in the sense that it presents a cross-cultural, cross-generational message in a song filled with hooks."

=== Comparison with Band Aid 30 ===
The song was frequently compared and contrasted with "Do They Know It's Christmas?" by Band Aid 30, a contemporaneous British charity single also released in response to the Ebola crisis. Several participating artists and commentators positioned "Africa Stop Ebola" as a corrective to what they saw as a paternalistic Western approach.

Congolese vocalist Barbara Kanam, who sang her part in Lingala, stated: "I agreed to sing this song because I think that today we need Africans to take our responsibility and to be involved in the battle against Ebola."

Malian rapper Mokobé said of the Band Aid video: "It stigmatizes us and gives a horrible image of the entire continent. What we want is for people to share our song in solidarity and mobilize together with us."

Salif Keita of Mali stated: "We always hear the negative things which come out of Africa — Africa is poverty — but Africa is not only poor, it is not a continent where you only find Ebola. There are other things which happen here, there are artists capable of doing something together."

Al Jazeera described the song as an example of "African solutions to African problems," noting that it had been produced entirely by African musicians before Band Aid 30 was even announced.

== Legacy ==
=== Community engagement and the Africa Stop Ebola Song Contest ===
Building on the success of the original recording, in 2015 Valérie Malot, Carlos Chirinos, and the participating West African musicians launched a follow-on community engagement initiative: the Africa Stop Ebola Song Contest. The contest was held in Guinea and announced at a press conference in the Guinean capital Conakry — described as the "Ground Zero" of the current Ebola outbreak – with the aim of inviting local communities to compose and perform their own songs conveying Ebola prevention messages.

Participants were invited to perform songs in local dialects explaining what people should do when coming into contact with Ebola – covering advice such as not touching the sick or deceased, maintaining hygiene, and seeking medical help. The contest offered cash prizes to winning performers.

Guinean singer Manamba Kanté won the song contest in 2015.

=== Fighting Ebola: A Grand Challenge for Development ===
The Africa Stop Ebola Song Contest was selected as one of fifteen projects from over 1,500 applications to receive recognition from Fighting Ebola: A Grand Challenge for Development, a competitive grant programme calling for innovative solutions to stop the spread of the disease in West Africa. The programme was organised by the United States Agency for International Development (USAID) in partnership with the White House Office of Science and Technology Policy, the Centers for Disease Control and Prevention (CDC), and the United States Department of Defense.

The award confirmed the campaign's recognition as a model of music-driven, community-led public health communication. NYU Steinhardt's faculty profile of Professor Chirinos notes that his Africa Stop Ebola project "received the Grand Challenge for Development award from the White House, CDC, and the U.S. Department of Defense."

=== Broader impact ===
"Africa Stop Ebola" is considered a landmark example of African-led humanitarian music, consciously challenging the paradigm of Western-led charity campaigns. The producers sought to project a message of hope and African agency rather than helplessness, with Chirinos noting that "the positive stories about the survivors in Africa are not coming out enough."

The song stands alongside other African-produced Ebola awareness songs of the period – including "Ebola in Town" by Liberian musicians Samuel 'Shadow' Morgan and Edwin 'D-12' Tweh – as part of a broader movement of culturally embedded public health communication during the 2014 crisis.
