= Chartered Trading Standards Institute =

UK professional association

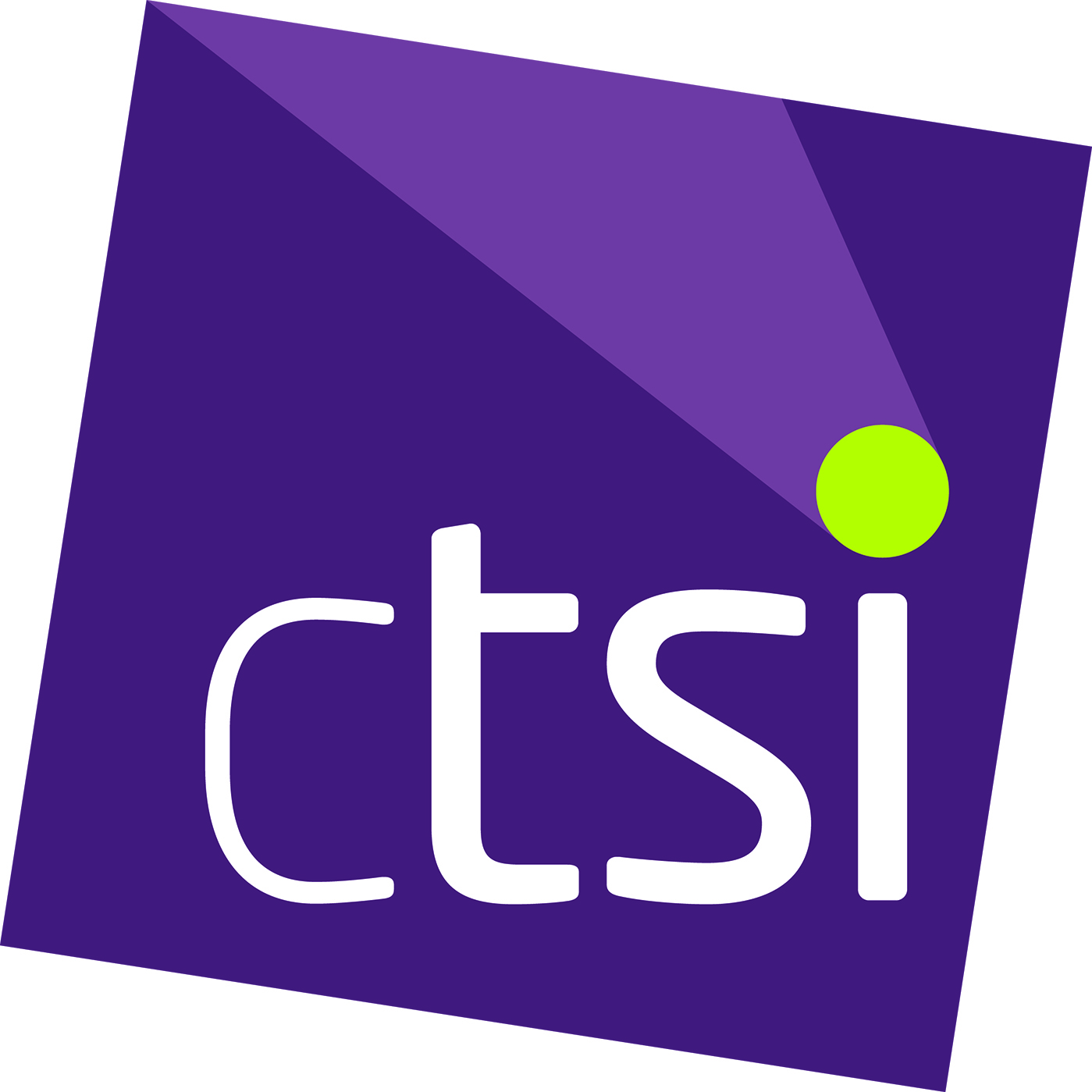
- Abbreviation: CTSI
- Predecessor: Institute of Trading Standards Administration (founded 1956)
- Formation: (as Incorporated Society of Inspectors of Weights and Measures) 1881; 145 years ago
- Type: Professional body
- Purpose: Trading standards in the UK
- Location: 1 Sylvan Court, Sylvan Way, Southfields Business Park, Laindon, Basildon, Essex SS15 6TH
- Region served: UK, Crown dependencies and overseas territories
- Members: British trading standards officers
- Chief Executive: John Herriman
- President: The Earl of Lindsay
- Main organ: CTSI Board CTSI Council
- Website: CTSI
- Formerly called: Incorporated Society of Inspectors of Weights and Measures (founded 1881)

The Chartered Trading Standards Institute (CTSI) is a professional association which represents and trains trading standards professionals working in local authorities, business and consumer sectors and in central government in the UK and overseas.

== History ==
The CTSI was formed from a merger of the Institute of Trading Standards Administration, created in 1956, and the Incorporated Society of Inspectors of Weights and Measures, established in 1881. It was granted its Royal charter by the Privy Council of the United Kingdom on 1 April 2015.

=== Hampton Report ===
The Hampton Report, commissioned in 2004 and published in 2005, led to the creation of the Local Better Regulation Office (LBRO). Previously the Consumer and Trading Standards Agency (CTSA), and then the Better Regulation Delivery Office (BRDO), it set standards on how trading standards and other business regulators carry out their work to minimise the impact on legitimate business. The Hampton Report also gave an enhanced role for the Office of Fair Trading (OFT). The OFT set national priorities and coordinated performance management of local authority trading standards services.

== Function ==
CTSI engages with, and makes representations to, government, UK and EU Parliamentary institutions, and key stakeholders in the local government, community, business and consumer sectors, and other regulatory agencies. It aims to sustain and improve consumer protection, health and wellbeing, together with the reinforcement of fair markets, facilitating business competitiveness and success.

The Institute also hosts the UK International Consumer Centre (UK ICC), which provides consumer advice with regards to cross-border disputes within the EU,

CTSI aims to bolster consumer protection and improve customer service standards by:

- the approval and promotion of codes of practice
- setting out the principles of effective customer service
- recognising trusted traders - via the CTSI approved code logo

In April 2012, the Department for Business, Innovation and Skills (BIS) invited the TSI to establish a successor to the Office of Fair Trading on a self-funding basis from April 2013. The management of the Consumer Codes Approval Scheme (CCAS) has now transferred to the Consumer Codes Approval Board (CCAB) operated by CTSI.

=== ADR approval ===
1 October 2015 the Alternative Dispute Resolution Directive came into force, and the CTSI was appointed to carry out the approval functions on behalf of the Secretary of State.

=== Goals ===
CTSI's strategic objectives for 2021 -2031 can be found in the CTSI Vision & Strategy

=== Events ===
Since 1988, the CTSI has held an annual National Consumer Week. Its 2018 theme was consumer rights and online market places, held 26 to 30 November. This underpinned by research conducted by the Citizens Advice Partnership Knowledge Hub. The 2019 event has been postponed until the beginning of 2020 due to Brexit uncertainty.

In June/July it holds an annual Conference that delivers a full education and training programme of the course of the event.

CTSI holds the Heroes Awards annually in the autumn, this provides an opportunity to recognise and celebrate those who have contributed to the profession and the protection of consumers.

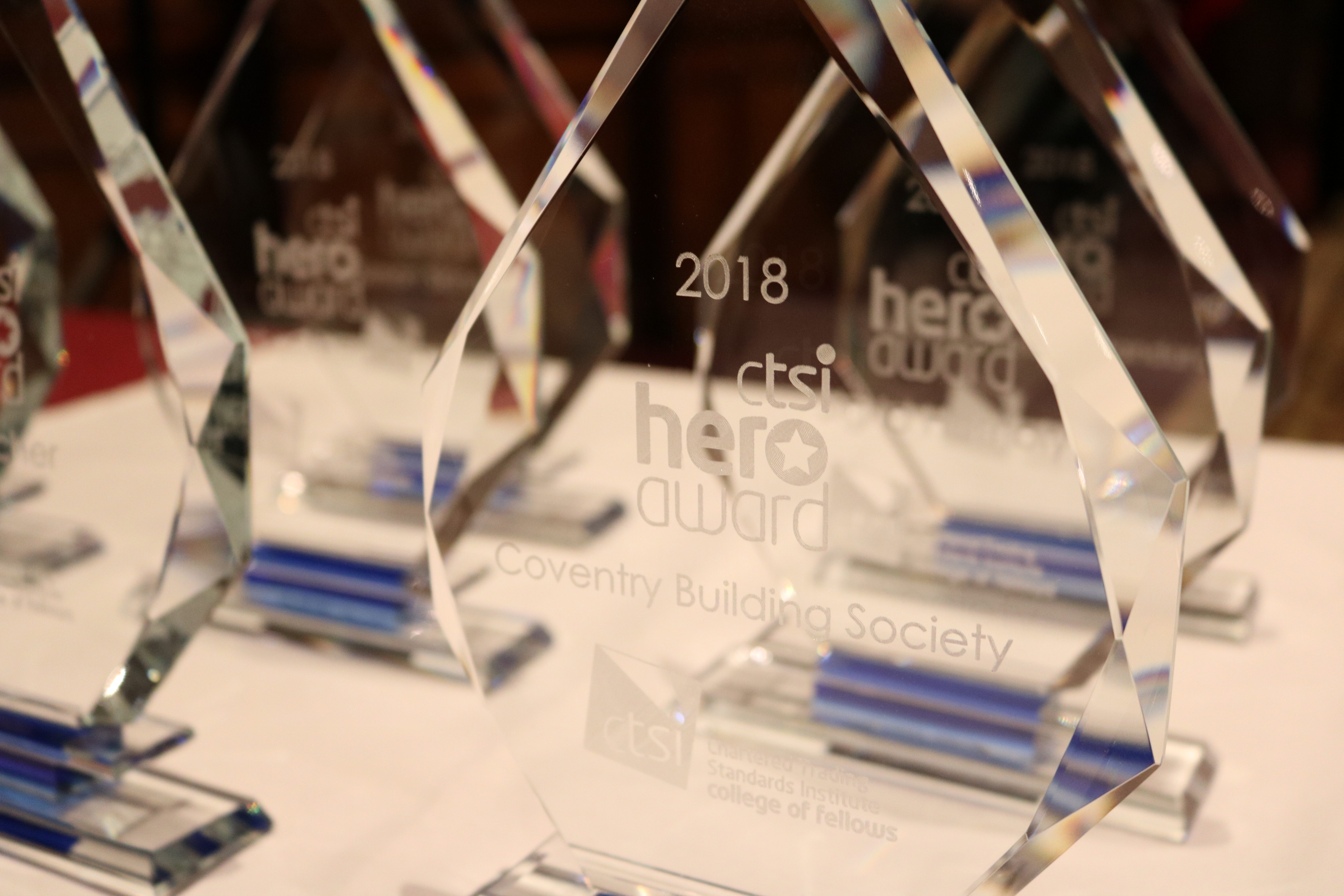
CTSI Hero Award Trophy

=== Publications ===
The CTSI publishes a bi-annual magazine and website under the title Journal of Trading Standards, produced on contract by Fourth Estate Creative.

== Structure ==
CTSI's headquarters is in the Southfields area of Laindon, south of Ford's Dunton Technical Centre, off the B148.

=== Members ===
CTSI members typically work in one of approximately 200 UK local authority trading standards offices, except in Northern Ireland where trading standards is provided by central government. Trading standards professionals work with consumers and businesses to maintain fair trading and safety of consumer goods. The CTSI also has members working in the private sector (they have their own section within the CTSI: the Business Members Group).

=== Staff ===
John Herriman took over as chief executive from interim chief executive Paul Ramsden in April 2021. The current CTSI chair is David MacKenzie, elected at the October 2025 AGM, who took over the role from Nikki Pasek.

=== Branches of the Institute ===
- East Midlands
- London
- Midlands
- Northern
- Northern Ireland
- North West
- Scottish
- South Eastern
- South East Midlands
- South West
- Southern
- Wales
- Yorkshire and the Humber

Sections of the Institute

- Association of Chief Trading Standards Officers (ACTSO)
- Business Members Group (BMG)
- Civil Service Forum (CSF)
- Consumer Empowerment Alliance (CEA)
- Welsh Heads of Trading Standards (WHOTS)
- Society of Chief Officers of Trading Standards in Scotland (SCOTSS)

== Citizens Advice Consumerline (previously Consumer Direct) ==
Trading Standards services work in partnership with the Citizens Advice Bureau consumer service to provide free, confidential and impartial advice on consumer issues. If consumers have concerns they are advised to report their concerns to the Citizens Advice consumer service (see external links) so that crucial intelligence can reach trading standards.

The Chartered Trading Standards Institute is a private company which supplies membership services and training for trading standards professionals; it does not handle consumer complaints.
