= Philip Hampton =

British businessman (born 1953)

Sir Philip Hampton
- Born: 5 October 1953 (age 72); United Kingdom
- Education: University of Oxford; INSEAD
- Occupation: Businessman

Sir Philip Roy Hampton (born 5 October 1953) is a British businessman. He was the first chairman of UK Financial Investments Limited in 2008 and chairman of government-owned The Royal Bank of Scotland Group between 2009 and 2015. He has also chaired GlaxoSmithKline and J Sainsbury.

== Early career ==
Hampton gained an MA in English from Lincoln College, Oxford, in 1975. He joined the accounting firm Coopers & Lybrand the same year, qualified as a chartered accountant in 1978, and then trained as an auditor, working in London and west Africa. He took an MBA from INSEAD from 1980 to 1981, and returned to join Lazards investment bank for nine years. Working on mergers, acquisitions, business restructurings and capital markets; in 1986 he was seconded to Lazard Freres, New York, and also worked extensively with Lazard Freres in Paris.

Since then Hampton has been finance director at a number of companies:

- British Steel plc – group finance director from 1990 to 1995; the company were a former client at Lazards
- British Gas plc – group finance director from 1995 to 1997; oversaw double-demerger of Centrica and then Lattice Group
- BG Group – group finance director from 1997 to 2000
- British Telecom – group finance director from 2000 to 2002
- Lloyds TSB – group finance director from 2002 to 2004

== Sainsbury ==
Hampton was appointed chairman of J Sainsbury plc, parent company of the Sainsbury's chain of supermarkets, on 19 July 2004. His appointment came at a significant time for the retailer; Sir Peter Davis had been forced out as chairman by shareholders due to an extremely generous bonus package despite his dubious performance as chairman and previously as CEO, another shareholder revolt in February 2004 had caused the company to abandon the appointment of Sir Ian Prosser as chairman and Justin King had been appointed chief executive in March 2004. Hampton was described by then BBC Business Editor Jeff Randall as "a well-respected City figure" and a "safe pair of hands". Under the King/Hampton leadership Sainsbury's regained some market share and in June 2006 reported its highest sales increase in four years. In November 2009, David Tyler took over as chair of Sainsbury's.

In the 2004 Budget, Hampton was asked to lead a review of regulatory inspection and enforcement. This review produced the Hampton Report, which led to the Regulatory Enforcement and Sanctions Act 2008.

Hampton was knighted in the New Year Honours 2007.

== RBS ==
On 3 November 2008, the government created UK Financial Investments Limited, and Philip Hampton was appointed as its first chairman. The company was set up to manage the UK government's shareholding in banks, which it had gained from banks subscribing to its recapitalisation fund during the 2008 financial crisis. He resigned to join Royal Bank of Scotland as deputy chairman on 19 January 2009 and was promoted to chairman on 3 February the same year. At that time, UK Financial Investments was majority shareholder of RBS, owning 58%.

In December 2009, the board of RBS warned their major shareholder, the British public, that they would resign unless they were permitted to pay bonuses of £1.5bn to staff in its investment arm. The matter received heavy criticism because it followed a £42bn taxpayer bailout of the banking system.

In January 2012, the board of RBS paid a bonus of £963,000 to Stephen Hester, the then chief executive. The Treasury permitted the payment because they feared Mr Hester and much of the board would have quit if the payment had been vetoed by the government as the majority shareholder. Hampton made the decision to turn down his £1.4m bonus before the uproar over Stephen Hester's bonus.

He stayed at RBS until September 2015, joining GlaxoSmithKline until August 2019.
