= IDRC =

IDRC may refer to:

- International Disaster and Risk Conference
- International Development Research Centre (Canada)
- International Dispute Resolution Centre
- Inclusive Design Research Centre
- International Drag Racing Competition
