= Regulatory risk differentiation =

Regulatory risk differentiation is the process used by a regulatory authority (the regulator - most often a tax administration) to systemically treat entities differently based on the regulator's assessment of the risks of the entity's non-compliance.

Regulators can include law enforcement agencies. Entities refers to those under the authority/control of the regulator – in most cases ranging from individuals to companies (legal entities) to multinationals operating within the regulator's jurisdiction.

The risk differentiation process requires the regulator to directly link a robust risk assessment, such as via a risk scoring model, to different regulatory responses (e.g. financial penalties, criminal imprisonment). Regulatory risk differentiation is also referred to as the Compliance Model in some regulatory agencies. See for example the Australian Prudential Regulatory Authority risk differentiation approach known as: PAIRS / SOARS. PAIRS is the Probability And Impact Rating System, while SOARS is the Supervisory Oversight And Response System.

== Alternative Compliance Models ==
=== Dualistic model ===
The simplest compliance model is a regulatory framework or model known as dualistic, where the regulator reacts to an entity's behaviours depending on whether the behaviour is seen as either right or wrong. This is also known as a black and white response, and is often used for strict liability offences in law.

=== Compliance continuum ===
It is a significant improvement to shift to a compliance continuum (or spectrum), where the regulator reacts to a spectrum of compliance behaviours. The Australian Customs Office applies a compliance continuum.

=== Compliance pyramid ===
When the reaction of the regulator is tied to the behaviour, it is known as a responsive compliance model. The responsive compliance model was suggested by Ian Ayres and John Braithwaite in their book Responsive Regulation: Transcending the deregulation debate which built on earlier work by John Scholz.

The Ayres and Braithwaite compliance model was elegantly represented as a compliance pyramid.

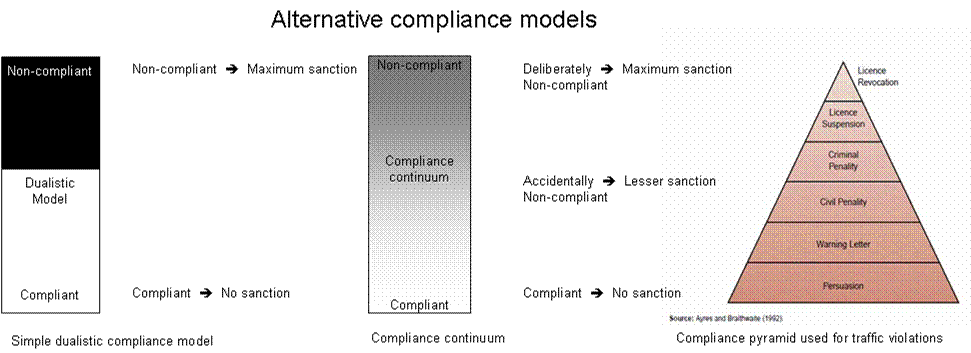

The shape of the compliance pyramid indicates:

- the number of clients that might be found at each level in the model,
- the hierarchical and escalating nature of regulatory engagement, and
- the increasing focus towards the apex on the small minority who appear to deliberately seek to contravene the system.

The choice of remedy (e.g. financial penalties, criminal imprisonment) imposed by the regulator becomes increasingly severe higher up the pyramid – with the view of creating an incentive for entities to move towards more compliant behaviours. The Australian Taxation Office (ATO) uses a compliance pyramid.

In the mid-1990s the ATO's Cash Economy Project further developed their compliance pyramid. An entity's apparent motivation for compliance or non-compliance, based on evidence (known as their motivational posture), was explicitly coupled to a suggested response.

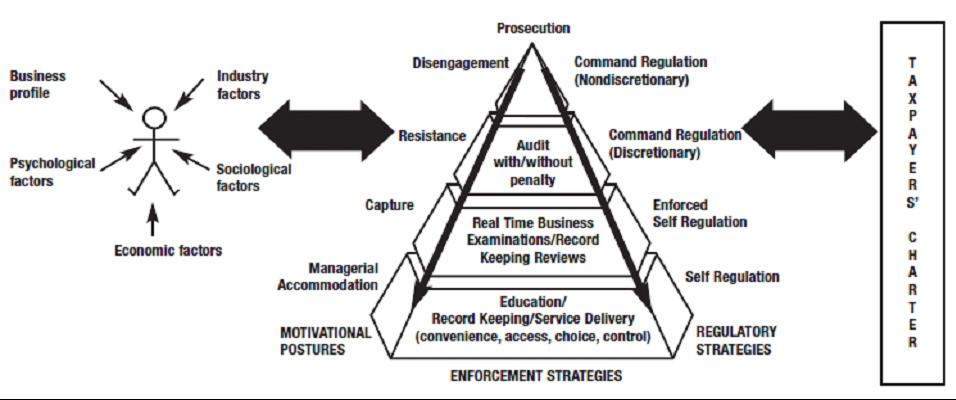
The ATO Compliance Model

In this version of the compliance pyramid, four broad categories of client (called archetypes) were defined by their underlying motivational postures:

- The disengaged clients who have decided not to comply,
- The resistant clients who don't want to comply,
- The captured clients who try to comply, but don't always succeed, and
- The accommodating clients who are willing to do the right thing.

This approach has been widely adopted, particularly within Australia. Several other regulators have similar approaches. It is also described as the enforcement pyramid by some regulators although enforcement is only one of the compliance strategies implicit in the model.

The strength of the model is the regulator being seen to apply the right remedy to the right situation, by taking an entity's apparent motivation (including their efforts to comply) into account. See for example Julia Black's paper: "'Chancer', 'Failure' or 'Trier'? Regulatory Conversations and the Construction of Identities" July 2008 or "The ATO Compliance Model in Action: A Case Study of Building and Construction by Neal Shover, Jenny Job and Anne Carroll" and "Reducing the risk of policy failure: challenges for regulatory compliance" The weakness of the compliance pyramid is that attitudes are generally not visible to the regulator, only behaviours. It also delivers no view of risk consequence.

In the OECD paper "Reducing the Risk to Policy Failure: Challenges for Regulatory Compliance" the regulatory responses were distilled down to ensuring that clients were ready, willing and able to comply. The approach is set out in 'Putting the Client First - The Emerging Copernican Revolution of Tax administration, Feb 2003 Tax Notes International

- Ready > Clients who know what compliance is > Knowledge constraint > Educate and Exemplify
- Willing > Clients who want to comply > Attitudinal constraint > Engage, Encourage, Enforce
- Able > Clients who are able to comply > Capability constraint > Enable and Empower

A similar framework is used in the UK Pension Regulator approach.

=== Risk bow-tie diagram ===
Another way of looking at this is as a risk bow-tie. See bow tie diagrams in risk management

Organisations in oil and gas, mining, aviation, industrials and finance have had success using risk bowtie approaches.

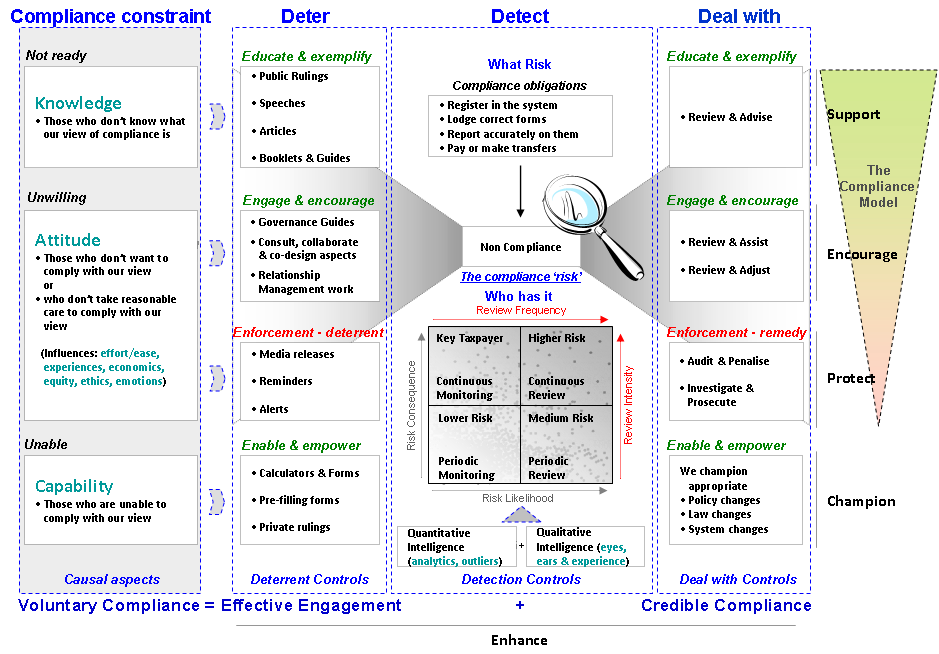
Generic Tax Compliance Risk Bow-Tie used by the ATO

.

These compliance enhancement strategies fit into a standard structure:

- deter, (educate, exemplify, engage, encourage, enable, empower)
- detect, (using quantitative and qualitative intelligence) and
- deal with (educate, exemplify, engage, encourage, enable, empower, enforce)

== What happens when the law is uncertain? ==
Some commentators do not believe that the compliance pyramid applies when legitimate differences of views exist as to compliant behaviour. Regulators all need to establish their positions in this situation, but it is clear that some regulators do still apply the compliance pyramid when the law is uncertain.

== Risk matrix mapping – the risk differentiation framework ==
Explicitly considering the likelihood and consequence of the risk of regulatory non-compliance

Some regulators vary regulatory risk differentiation approaches by mapping suggested remedies to an entity's perceived risk of non-compliance. This approach has been used by the Australian Prudential Regulatory Authority, the Australian Taxation Office and the UK Pension Regulator.

Explicitly considering the likelihood and consequences of an entity possibly breaking a law is a requirement of the UK Statutory Code of Practice for Regulators which emerged from the 2005 Hampton Report "Reducing administrative burdens – effective inspection and enforcement". The later Macrory Review "Regulatory Justice – making sanctions effective" effectively codifies the Ayres and Braithwaite Compliance Pyramid into the UK Regulatory Enforcement and Sanctions Act 2008.

In these compliance models the possibility of entities breaking a law has both a likelihood of occurrence and a consequence of occurrence, known as a 'risk event'. Considering entities' likelihood of not complying and the consequences of their not complying usually provides a 'power distribution' of a few large consequence or higher likelihood clients and many more lower consequence/likelihood ones.

This can be represented as a scatter plot on a risk matrix, as shown in the adjacent diagram.

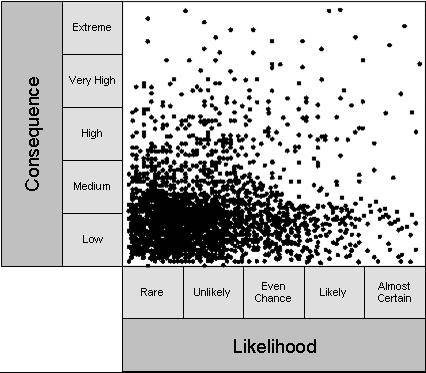
Scatterplot of ratings of risk of entities breaking a law

The scatterplot risk matrix to the left shows that most entities are compliant most of the time – in other words, assessed as both lower consequence and lower likelihood of their not complying with the law.

From a risk management perspective the regulator has a more significant interest in higher consequence clients or events than lower consequence. The next two diagrams build on the scatterplot diagram to the left.

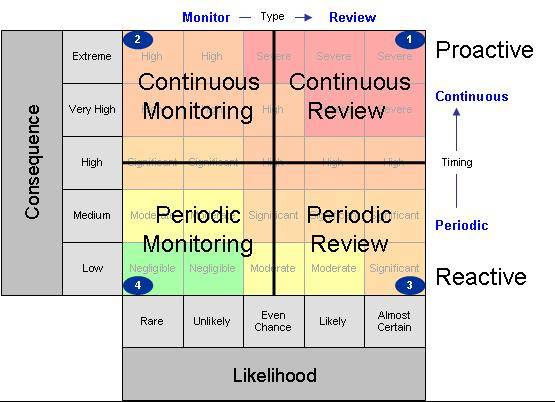
ATO risk matrix

In this example of the risk differentiation framework developed by Dr Stuart Hamilton in 2007, the ATO links its strategies to the likelihood and consequences of entities not complying with a law. The ATO risk differentiation framework to the left shows how the ATO divides its clients into four categories, and allocates appropriate risk management strategies to each category.

These strategies are proactive and continuous for higher consequence, reactive and periodic for lower consequence. The strategies are reviewing / auditing for taxpayers more likely to break the law, and only monitoring for those less likely.

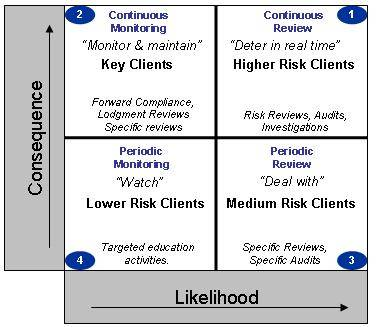
Detailed ATO risk matrix

The diagram to the left provides more detail, giving names to each category of client, providing all of the strategies - deter, detect and deal with strategies, and the strategies' associated activities.

The boundaries between category are able to be moved to allocate more or fewer clients to each category. Reflecting the underlying Pareto distribution, it is normal to see fewer higher likelihood and/or consequence clients rather than 50% of the population or 50% of the assessed likelihood or consequence. In other words, the boundary is shifted so there can be a strong focus on the few assessed to be higher risk.

This allows more resources to be allocated to more intensive strategies focusing on higher risk entities, providing an incentive to entities to want to be seen to be compliant. The robustness of the risk assessments, and the quality of the data on which the assessments rely, are therefore very important.

Key Clients or Key Taxpayers, due to their size, have an abnormally large impact upon the integrity of the tax system and are therefore prime targets for 'cooperative compliance' approaches. This cooperative compliance approach was originally developed by Dr Stuart Hamilton with Jim Killaly and Alice Dobes of the ATO in 1999. See ATO 2000 Cooperative Compliance. The Cooperative Compliance approach was later adopted by the OECD Forum on Tax Administration as best practice. See OECD 2013 Cooperative Compliance - a framework.

The diagram below shows how end to end risk management steps (from ISO 31000) align with risk differentiation and the risk bow-tie.

== Use of the regulatory risk differentiation approach, including awards ==
In September 2009 the UK Pension Regulator, which uses this approach, was shortlisted for a Better Regulation Award.

The above approach was discussed in the ATO Commissioners speech "Do you see what I see" given to the Australian Tax Teachers Association in January 2010. In June 2010 the ATO released its revised "Large Business and Tax Compliance" booklet that detailed its approach to risk differentiation in the Large Market.

In January 2011 the risk differentiation approach was also 'highly commended' in the annual Australian Comcover Risk awards.

The entire approach is mapped out in the UNSW ATAX 2012 paper 'New dimensions in regulatory compliance' and in the UNSW PhD Thesis: 'Managing Ambiguous Compliance in Highly Skewed Populations'.

For a whole of taxpayer population risk differentiation framework example see FIGURE 4. Tailoring the Risk Treatments to Segments and Risk Posture in the IMF Technical Note: 'Compliance Risk Management: Developing Compliance Improvement Plans' 2022.

For a simple excel based RDF worksheet using effective tax rates and turnover for views of likelihood of concern and consequence see the segment RDF calculator.
