= Risk control =

Process in which identified risks are reduced or mitigated

Risk control, also known as hazard control, is a part of the risk management process in which methods for neutralising or reduction of identified risks are implemented. Controlled risks remain potential threats, but the probability of an associated incident or the consequences thereof have been significantly reduced.

Risk control logically follows after hazard identification and risk assessment.

The most effective method for controlling a risk is to eliminate the hazard, but this is not always reasonably practicable. There is a recognised hierarchy of hazard controls which is listed in a generally descending order of effectiveness and preference:

- Elimination - the complete removal or avoidance of the hazard also removes the risk.
- Substitution - A less hazardous or lower risk material, equipment or process may be available.
- Isolation - If the hazard can be separated from the people or equipment at risk by barriers or demarcated areas. the risk is reduced.
- Safeguards - Tools or equipment, can be modified by fitting guards, interlocks and similar engineering solutions.
- Procedural methods – Safer ways to do something.
- Personal protective equipment and clothing (PPE) is the last resort.

A combination of two or more of these methods may be most effective, or even necessary.
