= Hampton Report =

2005 UK government report

Reducing administrative burdens – effective inspection and enforcement (the Hampton Report) is a March 2005 UK publication produced under businessman Philip Hampton. The UK Statutory Code of Practice for Regulators is based on its recommendations with the purpose to promote efficient and effective approaches to regulatory inspection and enforcement.

In the 2004 Budget, Hampton was asked to lead a review of regulatory inspection and enforcement. This review produced the Hampton Report. This report, together with the later Macrory Review "Regulatory Justice – making sanctions effective" led to the UK Regulatory Enforcement and Sanctions Act 2008.

One result was that the Ayres and Braithwaite Compliance Pyramid was effectively codified into UK law.

The Hampton Report also recommended an enhanced role for the Office of Fair Trading (OFT). The OFT were to set national priorities and coordinate performance management of local authority trading standards services.

== Local Better Regulation Office ==
The 2005 Report initiated the creation of the Local Better Regulation Office (LBRO) as a government-owned company statutory corporation with statutory powers. Previously the Consumer and Trading Standards Agency (CTSA), it set out standards on how trading standards and other business regulators carried out their work to minimise the impact on legitimate business.

The LBRO was dissolved on 1 April 2012, its functions taken over by the Better Regulation Delivery Office, an independent unit within the Department for Business, Innovation and Skills.

Dr. Clive Lester Grace, erstwhile Chair of the LBRO, was awarded an OBE in the 2013 New Year Honours for services to Business and voluntary service to Communities.
