= Risk control strategies =

Risk Control Strategies are the defensive measures utilized by IT and InfoSec communities to limit vulnerabilities and manage risks to an acceptable level. There are a number of strategies that can be employed as one measure of defense or in a combination of multiple strategies together. A risk assessment is an important tool that should be incorporated in the process of identifying and determining the threats and vulnerabilities that could potentially impact resources and assets to help manage risk. Risk management is also a component of a risk control strategy because Nelson et al. (2015) state that "risk management involves determining how much risk is acceptable for any process or operation, such as replacing equipment".

Examples of Threats
Social Engineering
Theft
Vandalism
Forces of nature
Human error
Software errors
Hardware errors

== Strategies ==
Five basic strategies to control risks that arise from vulnerabilities

1. Defense - Applying safeguards that eliminate or reduce the remaining uncontrolled risk
2. Transferral - Shifting risks to other areas or to outside entities
3. Mitigation - Reducing the impact of information assets should an attacker successfully exploit a vulnerability
4. Acceptance - Understanding the consequences of choosing to leave a risk uncontrolled and then properly acknowledging the risk that remains without an attempt at control
5. Termination - Removing or discontinuing the information asset from the organization's operating environment

== Defense ==
The defense strategy works to deter the exploitation of the vulnerability that requires protection. Defense methods can apply physical, logical, or a combination of both to provide protection as a defense strategy. The application of multiple layers of defensive measures is called defense in depth. Defense in depth applies access controls that Stewart et al. (2012) describe as "multiple layers or levels of access controls are deployed to provide layered security"

== Transferal ==
This strategy according to Stallings & Brown is the "Sharing responsibility for the risk with a third party. This is typically achieved by taking out insurance against the risk occurring, by entering into a contract with another organization, or by using partnership or joint venture structures to share the risks and costs should the threat eventuate." The act of purchasing insurance is an example of risk transferral.

== Mitigation ==
The mitigation strategy attempts to reduce the damage of a vulnerability by employing measures to limit a successful attack. According to Hill (2012), "this can be done by fixing a flaw that creates an exposure to risk or by putting compensatory controls in place that either reduce the likelihood of the weakness actually causing damage or reduce the impact if the risk that is associated with the flaw actually materialized.

== Acceptance ==
This strategy accepts the identified risk and deploys no defense strategy. A reason for using an acceptance strategy is that the cost associated with deploying safeguards outweighs the damage of a successful attack or compromise.

== Termination ==
Instead of using a safeguard to protect an asset or deploying zero safeguards and accepting the risks to an asset, this strategy removes the asset from the environment with risks. An example of this strategy would be to remove a server from a network because the company has determined that termination of the resource outweighs the benefit of leaving it on the network due to risk concerns.
