= Regulatory Enforcement and Sanctions Act 2008 =

Act of the Parliament of the United Kingdom

Regulatory Enforcement and Sanctions Act 2008 (Note: Section 77.)
- Act of Parliament
- Parliament of the United Kingdom
- Long title: An Act to make provision for the establishment of the Local Better Regulation Office; for the co-ordination of regulatory enforcement by local authorities; for the creation of civil sanctions in relation to regulatory offences; for the reduction and removal of regulatory burdens; and for connected purposes.
- Citation: 2008 c. 13
- Introduced by: Lord Bach on behalf of Lord Jones
- Territorial extent: England and Wales; Scotland; Northern Ireland; (Note: Section 75.)

Dates
- Royal assent: 21 July 2008
- Commencement: 1 October 2008 (Note: Section 76.)
Other legislation
Amended by	Postal Services Act 2011; Charities Act 2011; Scrap Metal Dealers Act 2013; Investigatory Powers Act 2016; Offensive Weapons Act 2019; Sentencing Act 2020; Digital Markets, Competition and Consumers Act 2024; Renters' Rights Act 2025; Employment Rights Act 2025; Tobacco and Vapes Act 2026

Status: Amended

History of passage through Parliament

Text of statute as originally enacted

Revised text of statute as amended

The Regulatory Enforcement and Sanctions Act 2008 (c. 13) is an act of the Parliament of the United Kingdom which is designed to provide for more consistent enforcement of regulations across local authority boundaries, better co-ordination between local authorities and central government, and more effective enforcement of regulations. It also requires regulators to conform to certain principles. The act was passed in response to the Hampton report, commissioned in the 2004 budget.

The act has four parts:

- Part 1 re-establishes Local Better Regulation Office, already established in May 2007 as a government-owned company, as a statutory corporation with statutory powers.
- Part 2 established a Primary Authority scheme, whereby businesses which operate in more than one local authority area can choose to nominate one authority as the primary one for regulatory purposes.
- Part 3 introduces four new civil penalties that regulatory authorities will be able to impose on businesses.
- Part 4 imposes a duty on regulators to keep their regulatory activity under review and remove unnecessary burdens, and to keep their regulatory activities to a necessary minimum.
