= International Disaster and Risk Conference =

Annual conference hosted by the Global Risk Forum

The International Disaster and Risk Conference (IDRC) is a global gathering of experts for risk reduction, disaster management, and climate change adaptation. Organized and hosted by the Global Risk Forum, IDRCs are held as a biennial conference in Davos, Switzerland and complemented every other year with regional conferences hosted in different regions of the world and endorse the UNISDR Global Platform meetings (GP in 2007, 2009, 2011, 2013, and 2015).

The IDRC conferences promote an integral risk management approach – across subject areas, professions, and sectors – encompassing scientific understanding with business, policy responses, the media and citizen participation. The IDRCs encourage stronger ties with adequate public–private partnership models and devising approaches for moving towards a more integrative way of thinking about disaster and risks.

Additional conferences and workshops dealing with specific disaster and risk topics may be organized in Davos or elsewhere. The conferences and workshops aim to provide solutions for effective and efficient global disaster and risk management and climate change adaptation. These issues need the involvement of all stakeholders of the public and the private sector.

Originally organized by the Swiss Federal Research Institute WSL, since 2007 IDRCs are organised by the Global Risk Forum GRF Davos. Patronage of IDRC include the Swiss Agency for Development and Cooperation SDC, UN organisations such as UNESCO, UN ISDR, UNDP, UNEP and ILO as well as the private sector like Swiss Re.

IDRC conferences and workshops contribute to harmonizing risk reduction and disaster management with climate change adaptation measures. The IDRC Conferences provide an ideal platform for assessment and dissemination activities, as well as for networking activities.

Year	Location	Conference
2006	Davos, Switzerland	1st International Disaster Reduction Conference – IDRC Davos 2006
2007	Harbin, China	1st regional International Disaster Reduction Conference – IDRC Harbin 2007
2008	Davos, Switzerland	2nd International Disaster Reduction Conference IDRC Davos 2008 "Public-Private Partnership – key for integral risk management and climate change mitigation and adaptation"
2009	Chengdu, China	2nd regional International Disaster Reduction Conference IDRC Chengdu 2007 "Wengchuan Earthquake, the path forward"
2010	Davos, Switzerland	3rd International Disaster Reduction Conference IDRC Davos 2010 "Risk, Disasters, Crisis and Global Change – From Threats to Sustainable Opportunities"
2012	Davos, Switzerland	4th International Disaster Reduction Conference IDRC Davos 2012 "Integrative Risk Management in a Changning World - Pathways to a Resilient Society"
2014	Davos, Switzerland	5th International Disaster Reduction Conference IDRC Davos 2014 "Integrative Risk Management - The role of science, technology & practice"

== Outcomes of the IDRCs ==
=== IDRC 2010 ===
The International Disaster and Risk Conference IDRC Davos 2010 with its motto "Risk, Disasters, Crisis and Global Change – From Threats to Sustainable Opportunities" was a milestone toward the integration of the ever more complex and interwoven portfolio of risk, security and disaster related topics, themes and trends as addressed by UN Secretary-General Ban Ki Moon in his message to IDRC Davos 2010.

At IDRC Davos 2010 some 850 conference participants from 100 countries all over the world have gathered in a unique setting and atmosphere. High-ranking delegations from The Gambia, Uganda, Republic of the Congo, from the I.R.Iran, from India, P.R. China, and Indonesia participated.

Thirteen plenary sessions, around 50 special and parallel sessions, side events, poster sessions, exhibitions, workshops, training courses and cultural events provided the frame for this worthwhile undertaking. It is remarkable to realize how far the formerly fragmented, global risk and disaster community has grown into one distinctive body of excellence.

To increase the interaction and exchange knowledge and ideas, GRF transformed the concentrated collection of ideas and knowledge presented at IDRC Davos 2010 into an interactive portfolio of presentations, video recorded plenary sessions and video statements.

=== IDRC 2014 ===
Over 700 participants from more than 80 countries attended the conference, including participants, from the United Nations and international organizations; from NGOs, the private sector, science and the media.

With 9 keynote presentations, 15 special panels, 85 sessions, 5 workshops, 78 posters, 23 panellists and 311 presenters; 5 book presentations; 4 lunch cinemas, the IDRC Davos continues to be a tradition of bringing together different actors and stakeholders to take stock of the progress made in integrative risk management and to suggest ways forward to improve risk management.

The outcomes of the IDRC Davos 2014 shall serve as the science & technology input for the post-2015 framework for Disaster Risk Reduction (HFA2) and provide recommendations towards the UN World Conference WCDRR in Sendai, Japan. An outcomes report will be published in due time.

== See also ==
- Risk management
- ISO 31000
