= Risk management =

Identification, evaluation and control of risks

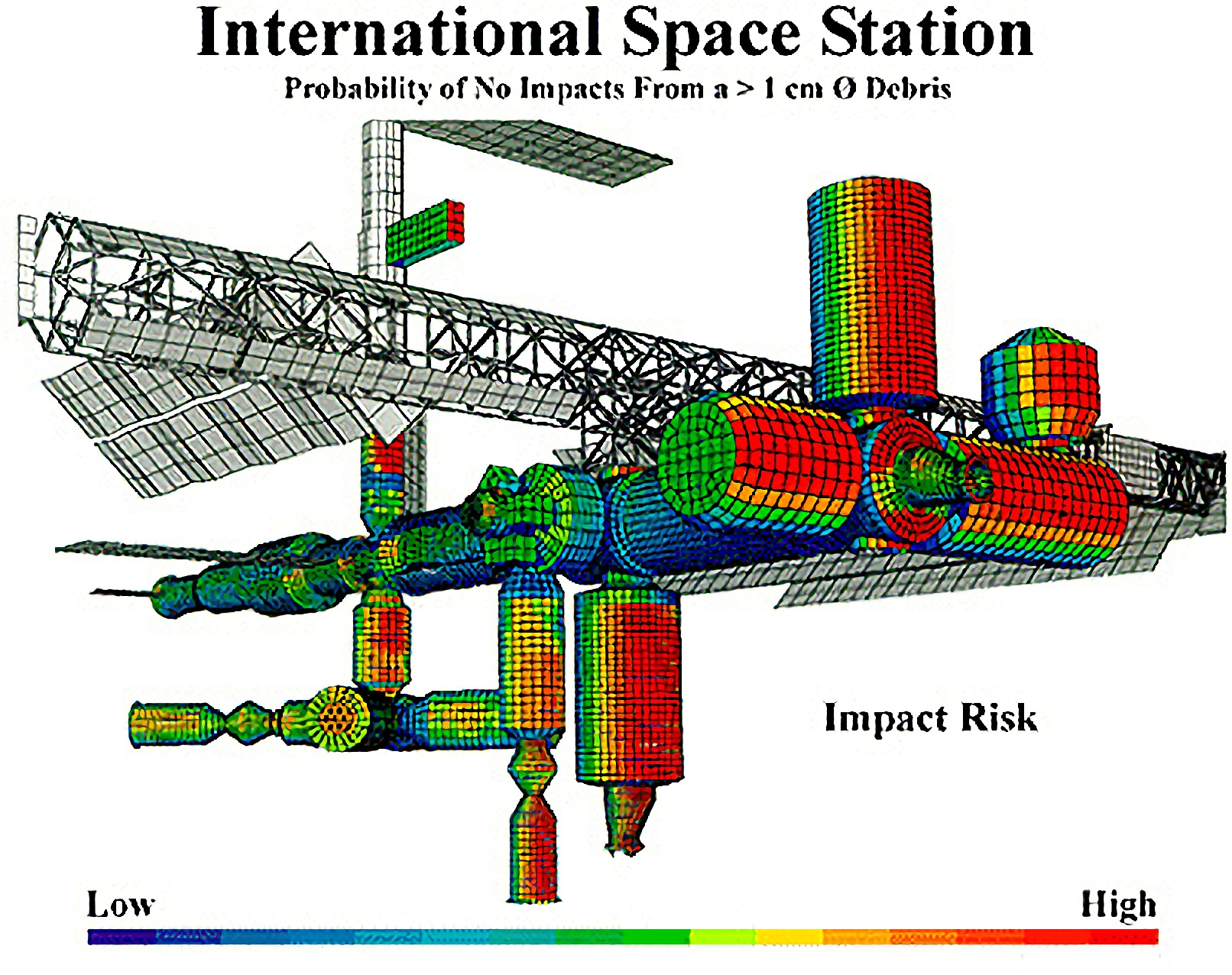
Example of risk assessment: A NASA model showing areas at high risk from impact for the International Space Station

Risk management is the identification, evaluation, and prioritization of risks, followed by the minimization, monitoring, and control of the impact or probability of those risks occurring. Risks can come from various sources (i.e., threats), including uncertainty in international markets, political instability, dangers of project failures (at any phase in design, development, production, or sustaining of life-cycles), legal liabilities, credit risk, accidents, natural causes and disasters, deliberate attack from an adversary, or events of uncertain or unpredictable root-cause. Retail traders also apply risk management by using fixed percentage position sizing and risk-to-reward frameworks to avoid large drawdowns and support consistent decision-making under pressure.

Two types of events are analyzed in risk management: risks and opportunities. Negative events can be classified as risks while positive events are classified as opportunities. Risk management standards have been developed by various institutions, including the Project Management Institute, the National Institute of Standards and Technology, actuarial societies, and International Organization for Standardization. Methods, definitions and goals vary widely according to whether the risk management method is in the context of project management, security, engineering, industrial processes, financial portfolios, actuarial assessments, or public health and safety. Certain risk management standards have been criticized for having no measurable improvement on risk, whereas the confidence in estimates and decisions seems to increase.

Strategies to manage threats (uncertainties with negative consequences) typically include avoiding the threat, reducing the negative effect or probability of the threat, transferring all or part of the threat to another party, and even retaining some or all of the potential or actual consequences of a particular threat. The opposite of these strategies can be used to respond to opportunities (uncertain future states with benefits).

As a professional role, a risk manager will "oversee the organization's comprehensive insurance and risk management program, assessing and identifying risks that could impede the reputation, safety, security, or financial success of the organization", and then develop plans to minimize and/or mitigate any negative (financial) outcomes. Risk analysts support the technical side of the organization's risk management approach: once risk data has been compiled and evaluated, analysts share their findings with their managers, who use those insights to decide among possible solutions. See also Chief Risk Officer, internal audit, and Financial risk management § Corporate finance.

== Introduction ==
Risk is defined as the possibility that an event will occur that adversely affects the achievement of an objective. Uncertainty, therefore, is a key aspect of risk. Risk management appears in scientific and management literature since the 1920s. It became a formal science in the 1950s, when articles and books with "risk management" in the title also appear in library searches. Most of research was initially related to finance and insurance. One popular standard clarifying vocabulary used in risk management is ISO Guide 31073:2022, "Risk management — Vocabulary".

Ideally in risk management, a prioritization process is followed. Whereby the risks with the greatest loss (or impact) and the greatest probability of occurring are handled first. Risks with lower probability of occurrence and lower loss are handled in descending order. In practice the process of assessing overall risk can be tricky, and organisation has to balance resources used to mitigate between risks with a higher probability but lower loss, versus a risk with higher loss but lower probability. Opportunity cost represents a unique challenge for risk managers. It can be difficult to determine when to put resources toward risk management and when to use those resources elsewhere. Again, ideal risk management optimises resource usage (spending, manpower etc), and also minimizes the negative effects of risks.

=== Risks vs. opportunities ===
Opportunities first appear in academic research or management books in the 1990s. The first PMBoK Project Management Body of Knowledge draft of 1987 doesn't mention opportunities at all.

Modern project management school recognize the importance of opportunities. Opportunities have been included in project management literature since the 1990s, e.g. in PMBoK, and became a significant part of project risk management in the years 2000s, when articles titled "opportunity management" also begin to appear in library searches. Opportunity management thus became an important part of risk management.

Modern risk management theory deals with all types of external events, both positive and negative. Positive risks are called opportunities. Similar to risks, opportunities have specific mitigation strategies: exploit, share, enhance, or ignore.

In practice, risks are considered "usually negative". Risk-related research and practice focus significantly more on threats than on opportunities. This can lead to negative phenomena such as target fixation.

=== Method ===
For the most part, these methods consist of the following elements, performed, more or less, in the following order:

1. Identify the threats.
2. Assess the vulnerability of critical assets to specific threats.
3. Determine the risk (i.e. the expected likelihood and consequences of specific attacks on specific assets).
4. Identify ways to reduce those risks.
5. Prioritize risk reduction measures.

The Risk management knowledge area, as defined by the Project Management Body of Knowledge PMBoK, consists of the following processes:

1. Plan Risk Management – defining how to conduct risk management activities.
2. Identify Risks – identifying individual project risks as well as sources.
3. Perform Qualitative Risk Analysis – prioritizing individual project risks by assessing probability and impact.
4. Perform Quantitative Risk Analysis – numerical analysis of the effects.
5. Plan Risk Responses – developing options, selecting strategies and actions.
6. Implement Risk Responses – implementing agreed-upon risk response plans. In the 4th Ed. of PMBoK, this process was included as an activity in the Monitor and Control process, but was later separated as a distinct process in PMBoK 6th Ed.
7. Monitor Risks – monitoring the implementation. This process was known as Monitor and Control in the previous PMBoK 4th Ed., when it also included the "Implement Risk Responses" process.

=== Principles ===
The International Organization for Standardization (ISO) identifies the following principles for risk management:

- Create value – resources expended to mitigate risk should be less than the consequence of inaction.
- Be an integral part of organizational processes.
- Be part of the decision-making process.
- Explicitly address uncertainty and assumptions.
- Use a systematic and structured process.
- Use the best available information.
- Be flexible.
- Take human factors into account.
- Be transparent and inclusive.
- Be dynamic, iterative and responsive to change.
- Be capable of continual improvement and enhancement.
- Continual reassessment.

=== Mild versus wild risk ===
Benoit Mandelbrot distinguished between "mild" and "wild" risk and argued that risk assessment and management must be fundamentally different for the two types of risk. Mild risk follows normal or near-normal probability distributions, is subject to regression to the mean and the law of large numbers, and is therefore relatively predictable. Wild risk follows fat-tailed distributions, e.g., Pareto or power-law distributions, is subject to regression to the tail (infinite mean or variance, rendering the law of large numbers invalid or ineffective), and is therefore difficult or impossible to predict. A common error in risk assessment and management is to underestimate the wildness of risk, assuming risk to be mild when in fact it is wild, which must be avoided if risk assessment and management are to be valid and reliable, according to Mandelbrot.

== Process ==
According to the standard ISO 31000, "Risk management – Guidelines", the process of risk management consists of several steps as follows:

=== Establishing the context ===
This involves:

1. observing the context (the environment of the organization)
  - the social scope of risk management
  - the identity and objectives of stakeholders
  - the basis upon which risks will be evaluated, constraints.
2. defining a framework for the activity and an agenda for identification
3. developing an analysis of risks involved in the process
4. mitigation or solution of risks using available technological, human and organizational resources

=== Identification ===
After establishing the context, the next step in the process of managing risk is to identify potential risks. Risks concern events that, when triggered, cause problems or benefits. Therefore, risk identification can begin either with the sources of problems and those of competitors (benefits) or with the consequences of the problems.

- Source analysis – Risk sources may be internal or external to the system that is the target of risk management (use mitigation instead of management since by its own definition risk deals with factors of decision-making that cannot be managed).

Some examples of risk sources are: stakeholders of a project, employees of a company or the weather over an airport.

- Problem analysis – Risks are related to identified threats. For example: the threat of losing money, the threat of abuse of confidential information or the threat of human errors, accidents and casualties. The threats may exist with various entities, most important with shareholders, customers and legislative bodies such as the government.

When either source or problem is known, the events that a source may trigger or the events that can lead to a problem can be investigated. For example: stakeholders withdrawing during a project may endanger funding of the project; confidential information may be stolen by employees even within a closed network; lightning striking an aircraft during takeoff may make all people on board immediate casualties.

The chosen method of identifying risks may depend on culture, industry practice and compliance. The identification methods are formed by templates or the development of templates for identifying source, problem or event. Common risk identification methods are:

- Objectives-based risk identification – Organizations and project teams have objectives. Any event that may prevent an objective from being achieved is identified as risk.
- Scenario-based risk identification – In scenario analysis different scenarios are created. The scenarios may be the alternative ways to achieve an objective, or an analysis of the interaction of forces in, for example, a market or battle. Any event that triggers an undesired scenario alternative is identified as risk – see Futures Studies for methodology used by Futurists.
- Taxonomy-based risk identification – The taxonomy in taxonomy-based risk identification is a breakdown of possible risk sources. Based on the taxonomy and knowledge of best practices, a questionnaire is compiled. The answers to the questions reveal risks.
- Common-risk checking – In several industries, lists with known risks are available. Each risk in the list can be checked for application to a particular situation.
- Risk charting – This method combines the above approaches by listing resources at risk, threats to those resources, modifying factors which may increase or decrease the risk and consequences it is wished to avoid. Creating a matrix under these headings enables a variety of approaches. One can begin with resources and consider the threats they are exposed to and the consequences of each. Alternatively one can start with the threats and examine which resources they would affect, or one can begin with the consequences and determine which combination of threats and resources would be involved to bring them about.

=== Assessment ===
Once risks have been identified, they must then be assessed as to their potential severity of impact (generally a negative impact, such as damage or loss) and to the probability of occurrence. These quantities can be either simple to measure, in the case of the value of a lost building, or impossible to know for sure in the case of an unlikely event, the probability of occurrence of which is unknown. Therefore, in the assessment process it is critical to make the best educated decisions in order to properly prioritize the implementation of the risk management plan.

Even a short-term positive improvement can have long-term negative impacts. Take the "turnpike" example. A highway is widened to allow more traffic. More traffic capacity leads to greater development in the areas surrounding the improved traffic capacity. Over time, traffic thereby increases to fill available capacity. Turnpikes thereby need to be expanded in a seemingly endless cycles. There are many other engineering examples where expanded capacity (to do any function) is soon filled by increased demand. Since expansion comes at a cost, the resulting growth could become unsustainable without forecasting and management.

The fundamental difficulty in risk assessment is determining the rate of occurrence since statistical information is not available on all kinds of past incidents and is particularly scanty in the case of catastrophic events, simply because of their infrequency. Furthermore, evaluating the severity of the consequences (impact) is often quite difficult for intangible assets. Asset valuation is another question that needs to be addressed. Thus, best educated opinions and available statistics are the primary sources of information. Nevertheless, risk assessment should produce such information for senior executives of the organization that the primary risks are easy to understand and that the risk management decisions may be prioritized within overall company goals. Thus, there have been several theories and attempts to quantify risks. Numerous different risk formulae exist, but perhaps the most widely accepted formula for risk quantification is: "Rate (or probability) of occurrence multiplied by the impact of the event equals risk magnitude."

== Risk options ==
Risk mitigation measures are usually formulated according to one or more of the following major risk options, which are:

1. Design a new business process with adequate built-in risk control and containment measures from the start.
2. Periodically re-assess risks that are accepted in ongoing processes as a normal feature of business operations and modify mitigation measures.
3. Transfer risks to an external agency (e.g. an insurance company)
4. Avoid risks altogether (e.g. by closing down a particular high-risk business area)

Later research has shown that the financial benefits of risk management are less dependent on the formula used but are more dependent on the frequency and how risk assessment is performed.

In business it is imperative to be able to present the findings of risk assessments in financial, market, or schedule terms. Robert Courtney Jr. (IBM, 1970) proposed a formula for presenting risks in financial terms. The Courtney formula was accepted as the official risk analysis method for the US governmental agencies. The formula proposes calculation of ALE (annualized loss expectancy) and compares the expected loss value to the security control implementation costs (cost–benefit analysis).

=== Potential risk treatments ===
Planning for risk management uses four essential techniques. Under the acceptance technique, the business intentionally assumes risks without financial protections in the hopes that possible gains will exceed prospective losses. The transfer approach shields the business from losses by shifting risks to a third party, frequently in exchange for a fee, while the third-party benefits from the project. By choosing not to participate in high-risk ventures, the avoidance strategy avoids losses but also loses out on possibilities. Last but not least, the reduction approach lowers risks by implementing strategies like insurance, which provides protection for a variety of asset classes and guarantees reimbursement in the event of losses.

Once risks have been identified and assessed, all techniques to manage the risk fall into one or more of these four major categories:

- Avoidance (eliminate, withdraw from or not become involved)
- Reduction (optimize – mitigate)
- Sharing (transfer – outsource or insure)
- Retention (accept and budget)

Ideal use of these risk control strategies may not be possible. Some of them may involve trade-offs that are not acceptable to the organization or person making the risk management decisions. Another source, from the US Department of Defense (see link), Defense Acquisition University, calls these categories ACAT, for Avoid, Control, Accept, or Transfer. This use of the ACAT acronym is reminiscent of another ACAT (for Acquisition Category) used in US Defense industry procurements, in which Risk Management figures prominently in decision making and planning.

Similarly to risks, opportunities have specific mitigation strategies: exploit, share, enhance, ignore.

==== Risk avoidance ====
This includes not performing an activity that could present risk. Refusing to purchase a property or business to avoid legal liability is one such example. Avoiding airplane flights for fear of hijacking. Avoidance may seem like the answer to all risks, but avoiding risks also means losing out on the potential gain that accepting (retaining) the risk may have allowed. Not entering a business to avoid the risk of loss also avoids the possibility of earning profits. Increasing risk regulation in hospitals has led to avoidance of treating higher risk conditions, in favor of patients presenting with lower risk.

==== Risk reduction ====
Risk reduction or "optimization" involves reducing the severity of the loss or the likelihood of the loss from occurring. For example, sprinklers are designed to put out a fire to reduce the risk of loss by fire. This method may cause a greater loss by water damage and therefore may not be suitable. Halon fire suppression systems may mitigate that risk, but the cost may be prohibitive as a strategy.

Acknowledging that risks can be positive or negative, optimizing risks means finding a balance between negative risk and the benefit of the operation or activity; and between risk reduction and effort applied. By effectively applying Health, Safety and Environment (HSE) management standards, organizations can achieve tolerable levels of residual risk.

Modern software development methodologies, such as Aladdin, reduce risk by developing and delivering software incrementally. Early methodologies suffered from the fact that they only delivered software in the final phase of development; any problems encountered in earlier phases meant costly rework and often jeopardized the whole project. By developing in iterations, software projects can limit effort wasted to a single iteration.

Outsourcing could be an example of risk sharing strategy if the outsourcer can demonstrate higher capability at managing or reducing risks. For example, a company may outsource only its software development, the manufacturing of hard goods, or customer support needs to another company, while handling the business management itself. This way, the company can concentrate more on business development without having to worry as much about the manufacturing process, managing the development team, or finding a physical location for a center. Also, implanting controls can also be an option in reducing risk. Controls that either detect causes of unwanted events prior to the consequences occurring during use of the product, or detection of the root causes of unwanted failures that the team can then avoid. Controls may focus on management or decision-making processes. All these may help to make better decisions concerning risk.

==== Risk sharing ====
Briefly defined as "sharing with another party the burden of loss or the benefit of gain, from a risk, and the measures to reduce a risk."

The term 'risk transfer' is often used in place of risk-sharing in the mistaken belief that you can transfer a risk to a third party through insurance or outsourcing. In practice, if the insurance company or contractor go bankrupt or end up in court, the original risk is likely to still revert to the first party. As such, in the terminology of practitioners and scholars alike, the purchase of an insurance contract is often described as a "transfer of risk." However, technically speaking, the buyer of the contract generally retains legal responsibility for the losses "transferred", meaning that insurance may be described more accurately as a post-event compensatory mechanism. For example, a personal injuries insurance policy does not transfer the risk of a car accident to the insurance company. The risk still lies with the policyholder namely the person who has been in the accident. The insurance policy simply provides that if an accident (the event) occurs involving the policyholder then some compensation may be payable to the policyholder that is commensurate with the suffering/damage.

Methods of managing risk fall into multiple categories. Risk-retention pools are technically retaining the risk for the group, but spreading it over the whole group involves transfer among individual members of the group. This is different from traditional insurance, in that no premium is exchanged between members of the group upfront, but instead, losses are assessed to all members of the group.

==== Risk retention ====
Risk retention involves accepting the loss, or benefit of gain, from a risk when the incident occurs. True self-insurance falls in this category. Risk retention is a viable strategy for small risks where the cost of insuring against the risk would be greater over time than the total losses sustained. All risks that are not avoided or transferred are retained by default. This includes risks that are so large or catastrophic that either they cannot be insured against or the premiums would be infeasible. War is an example since most property and risks are not insured against war, so the loss attributed to war is retained by the insured. Also any amounts of potential loss (risk) over the amount insured is retained risk. This may also be acceptable if the chance of a very large loss is small or if the cost to insure for greater coverage amounts is so great that it would hinder the goals of the organization too much.

=== Risk management plan ===
Select appropriate controls or countermeasures to mitigate each risk. Risk mitigation needs to be approved by the appropriate level of management. For instance, a risk concerning the image of the organization should have top management decision behind it whereas IT management would have the authority to decide on computer virus risks.

The risk management plan should propose applicable and effective security controls for managing the risks. For example, an observed high risk of computer viruses could be mitigated by acquiring and implementing antivirus software. A good risk management plan should contain a schedule for control implementation and responsible persons for those actions. There are four basic steps of risk management plan, which are threat assessment, vulnerability assessment, impact assessment and risk mitigation strategy development.

According to ISO/IEC 27001, the stage immediately after completion of the risk assessment phase consists of preparing a Risk Treatment Plan, which should document the decisions about how each of the identified risks should be handled. Mitigation of risks often means selection of security controls, which should be documented in a Statement of Applicability, which identifies which particular control objectives and controls from the standard have been selected, and why.

=== Implementation ===
Implementation involves executing all planned methods for mitigating the effects of risks. This includes purchasing insurance policies for risks that have been decided to be transferred to an insurer, avoiding all risks that can be avoided without compromising the entity's goals, reducing other risks, and retaining the remainder.

=== Review and evaluation of the plan ===
Initial risk management plans will never be perfect. Practice, experience, and actual loss results will necessitate changes in the plan and contribute information to allow possible different decisions to be made in dealing with the risks being faced.

Risk analysis results and management plans should be updated periodically. There are two primary reasons for this:

1. to evaluate whether the previously selected security controls are still applicable and effective
2. to evaluate the possible risk level changes in the business environment. For example, information risks are a good example of rapidly changing business environment.

== Areas ==
=== Enterprise ===
Enterprise risk management (ERM) defines risk as those possible events or circumstances that can have negative influences on the enterprise in question, where the impact can be on the very existence, the resources (human and capital), the products and services, or the customers of the enterprise, as well as external impacts on society, markets, or the environment. There are various defined frameworks here, where every probable risk can have a pre-formulated plan to deal with its possible consequences (to ensure contingency if the risk becomes a liability). Managers thus analyze and monitor both the internal and external environment facing the enterprise, addressing business risk generally, and any impact on the enterprise achieving its strategic goals. ERM thus overlaps various other disciplines - operational risk management, financial risk management etc. - but is differentiated by its strategic and long-term focus. ERM systems usually focus on safeguarding reputation, acknowledging its significant role in comprehensive risk management strategies.

=== Finance ===
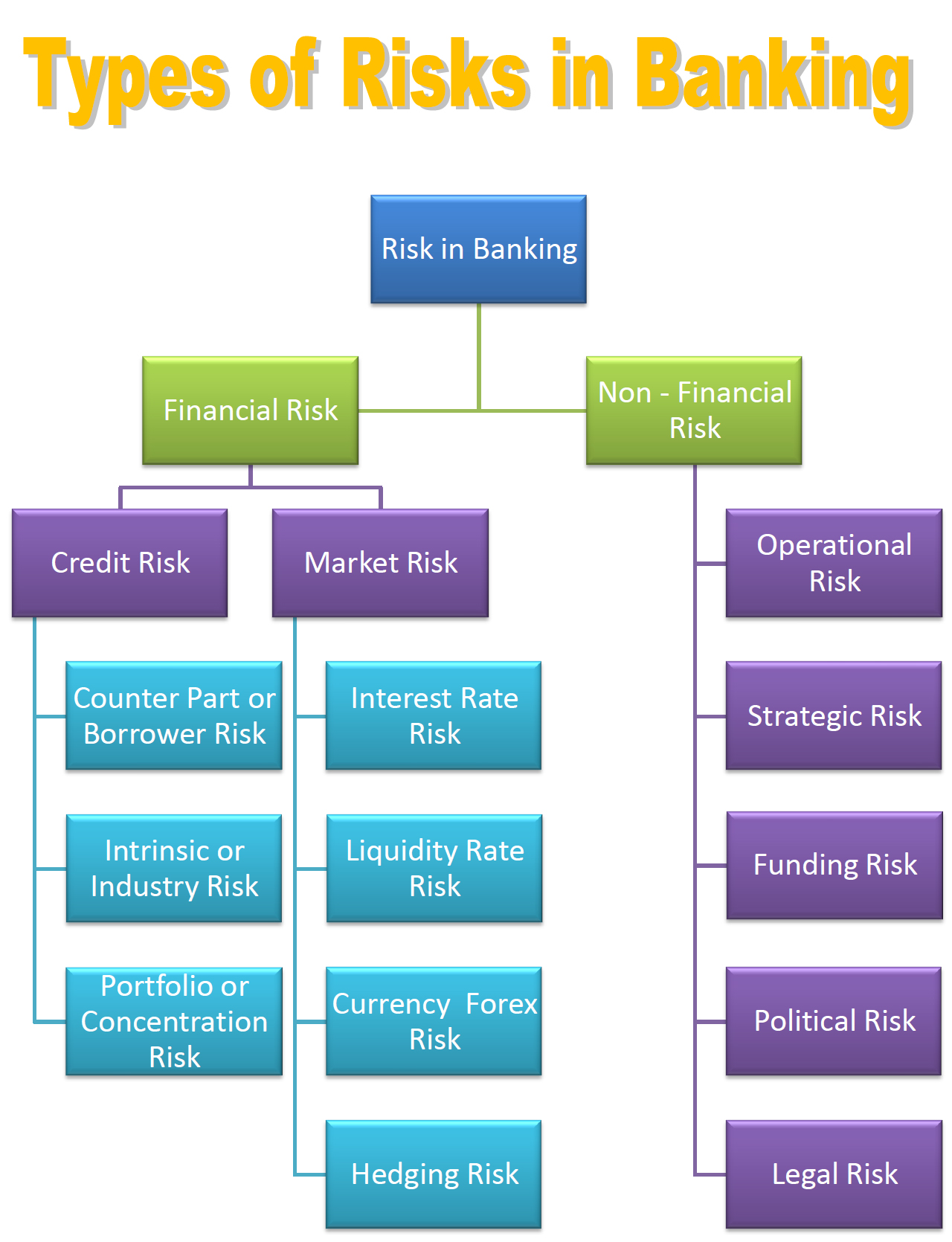
Risk in banking

As applied to finance, risk management concerns the techniques and practices for measuring, monitoring and controlling the market- and credit risk (and operational risk) on a firm's balance sheet, due to a bank's credit and trading exposure, or re a fund manager's portfolio value; for an overview see Finance § Risk management.

- A traditional measure in banking is value at risk (VaR) – the possible loss due to adverse credit and market events. Banks seek to hedge these risks, and will hold risk capital on the net position. The Basel III framework governs the parallel regulatory capital requirements, including for operational risk.
- Fund managers employ various strategies to protect their fund value; these given their mandate and benchmark.
- Non-financial firms focus on business risk more generally, overlapping enterprise risk management: i.e. those events and occurrences which could negatively impact cash flow or profitability, and hence result in a loss of business value or a decline in share price.

=== Contractual risk management ===
The concept of "contractual risk management" emphasises the use of risk management techniques in contract deployment, i.e. managing the risks which are accepted through entry into a contract. Norwegian academic Petri Keskitalo defines "contractual risk management" as "a practical, proactive and systematical contracting method that uses contract planning and governance to manage risks connected to business activities". In an article by Samuel Greengard published in 2010, two US legal cases are mentioned which emphasise the importance of having a strategy for dealing with risk:

- UDC v. CH2M Hill, which deals with the risk to a professional advisor who signs an indemnification provision including acceptance of a duty to defend, who may thereby pick up the legal costs of defending a client subject to a claim from a third party,
- Witt v. La Gorce Country Club, which deals with the effectiveness of a limitation of liability clause, which may, in certain jurisdictions, be found to be ineffective.

Greengard recommends using industry-standard contract language as much as possible to reduce risk as much as possible and rely on clauses which have been in use and subject to established court interpretation over a number of years.

=== Customs ===
Customs risk management is concerned with the risks which arise within the context of international trade and have a bearing on safety and security, including the risk that illicit drugs and counterfeit goods can pass across borders and the risk that shipments and their contents are incorrectly declared. The European Union has adopted a Customs Risk Management Framework (CRMF) applicable across the union and throughout its member states, whose aims include establishing a common level of customs control protection and a balance between the objectives of safe customs control and the facilitation of legitimate trade. Two events which prompted the European Commission to review customs risk management policy in 2012-13 were the September 11 attacks of 2001 and the 2010 transatlantic aircraft bomb plot involving packages being sent from Yemen to the United States, referred to by the Commission as "the October 2010 (Yemen) incident".

=== Enterprise security ===
ESRM is a security program management approach that links security activities to an enterprise's mission and business goals through risk management methods. The security leader's role in ESRM is to manage risks of harm to enterprise assets in partnership with the business leaders whose assets are exposed to those risks. ESRM involves educating business leaders on the realistic impacts of identified risks, presenting potential strategies to mitigate those impacts, then enacting the option chosen by the business in line with accepted levels of business risk tolerance.

=== Medical devices ===
For medical devices, risk management is a process for identifying, evaluating and mitigating risks associated with harm to people and damage to property or the environment. Risk management is an integral part of medical device design and development, production processes and evaluation of field experience, and is applicable to all types of medical devices. The evidence of its application is required by most regulatory bodies such as the US FDA. The management of risks for medical devices is described by the International Organization for Standardization (ISO) in ISO 14971:2019, Medical Devices—The application of risk management to medical devices, a product safety standard. The standard provides a process framework and associated requirements for management responsibilities, risk analysis and evaluation, risk controls and lifecycle risk management. Guidance on the application of the standard is available via ISO/TR 24971:2020.

The European version of the risk management standard was updated in 2009 and again in 2012 to refer to the Medical Devices Directive (MDD) and Active Implantable Medical Device Directive (AIMDD) revision in 2007, as well as the In Vitro Medical Device Directive (IVDD). The requirements of EN 14971:2012 are nearly identical to ISO 14971:2007. The differences include three "(informative)" Z Annexes that refer to the new MDD, AIMDD, and IVDD. These annexes indicate content deviations that include the requirement for risks to be reduced as far as possible, and the requirement that risks be mitigated by design and not by labeling on the medical device (i.e., labeling can no longer be used to mitigate risk).

Typical risk analysis and evaluation techniques adopted by the medical device industry include hazard analysis, fault tree analysis (FTA), failure mode and effects analysis (FMEA), hazard and operability study (HAZOP), and risk traceability analysis for ensuring risk controls are implemented and effective (i.e. tracking risks identified to product requirements, design specifications, verification and validation results etc.). FTA analysis requires diagramming software. FMEA analysis can be done using a spreadsheet program. There are also integrated medical device risk management solutions.

Through a draft guidance, the FDA has introduced another method named "Safety Assurance Case" for medical device safety assurance analysis. The safety assurance case is structured argument reasoning about systems appropriate for scientists and engineers, supported by a body of evidence, that provides a compelling, comprehensible and valid case that a system is safe for a given application in a given environment. With the guidance, a safety assurance case is expected for safety critical devices (e.g. infusion devices) as part of the pre-market clearance submission, e.g. 510(k). In 2013, the FDA introduced another draft guidance expecting medical device manufacturers to submit cybersecurity risk analysis information.

=== Project management ===
Project risk management must be considered at the different phases of acquisition. At the beginning of a project, the advancement of technical developments, or threats presented by a competitor's projects, may cause a risk or threat assessment and subsequent evaluation of alternatives (see Analysis of Alternatives). Once a decision is made, and the project begun, more familiar project management applications can be used:

- Planning how risk will be managed in the particular project. Plans should include risk management tasks, responsibilities, activities and budget.
- Assigning a risk officer – a team member other than a project manager who is responsible for foreseeing potential project problems. Typical characteristic of risk officer is a healthy skepticism.
- Maintaining live project risk database. Each risk should have the following attributes: opening date, title, short description, probability and importance. Optionally a risk may have an assigned person responsible for its resolution and a date by which the risk must be resolved.
- Creating anonymous risk reporting channel. Each team member should have the possibility to report risks that he/she foresees in the project.
- Preparing mitigation plans for risks that are chosen to be mitigated. The purpose of the mitigation plan is to describe how this particular risk will be handled – what, when, by whom and how will it be done to avoid it or minimize consequences if it becomes a liability.
- Summarizing planned and faced risks, effectiveness of mitigation activities, and effort spent for the risk management.

=== Megaprojects (infrastructure) ===
Megaprojects (sometimes also called "major programs") are large-scale investment projects, typically costing more than $1 billion per project. Megaprojects include major bridges, tunnels, highways, railways, airports, seaports, power plants, dams, wastewater projects, coastal flood protection schemes, oil and natural gas extraction projects, public buildings, information technology systems, aerospace projects, and defense systems. Megaprojects have been shown to be particularly risky in terms of finance, safety, and social and environmental impacts. Risk management is therefore particularly pertinent for megaprojects and special methods and special education have been developed for such risk management.

=== Natural disasters ===
It is important to assess risk in regard to natural disasters like floods, earthquakes, and so on. Outcomes of natural disaster risk assessment are valuable when considering future repair costs, business interruption losses and other downtime, effects on the environment, insurance costs, and the proposed costs of reducing the risk. The Sendai Framework for Disaster Risk Reduction is a 2015 international accord that has set goals and targets for disaster risk reduction in response to natural disasters. There are regular International Disaster and Risk Conferences in Davos to deal with integral risk management.

Several tools can be used to assess risk and risk management of natural disasters and other climate events, including geospatial modeling, a key component of land change science. This modeling requires an understanding of geographic distributions of people as well as an ability to calculate the likelihood of a natural disaster occurring.

=== Wilderness ===
The management of risks to persons and property in wilderness and remote natural areas has developed with increases in outdoor recreation participation and decreased social tolerance for loss. Organizations providing commercial wilderness experiences can now align with national and international consensus standards for training and equipment such as ANSI/NASBLA 101-2017 (boating), UIAA 152 (ice climbing tools), and European Norm 13089:2015 + A1:2015 (mountaineering equipment). The Association for Experiential Education offers accreditation for wilderness adventure programs. The Wilderness Risk Management Conference provides access to best practices, and specialist organizations provide wilderness risk management consulting and training.

The text Outdoor Safety – Risk Management for Outdoor Leaders, published by the New Zealand Mountain Safety Council, provides a view of wilderness risk management from the New Zealand perspective, recognizing the value of national outdoor safety legislation and devoting considerable attention to the roles of judgment and decision-making processes in wilderness risk management.

One popular models for risk assessment is the Risk Assessment and Safety Management (RASM) Model developed by Rick Curtis, author of The Backpacker's Field Manual. The formula for the RASM Model is: Risk = Probability of Accident × Severity of Consequences. The RASM Model weighs negative risk—the potential for loss, against positive risk—the potential for growth.

=== Information technology ===
IT risk is a risk related to information technology. This is a relatively new term due to an increasing awareness that information security is simply one facet of a multitude of risks that are relevant to IT and the real world processes it supports. "Cybersecurity is tied closely to the advancement of technology. It lags only long enough for incentives like black markets to evolve and new exploits to be discovered. There is no end in sight for the advancement of technology, so we can expect the same from cybersecurity."

ISACA's Risk IT framework ties IT risk to enterprise risk management.

IT risk management includes "incident handling", an action plan for dealing with intrusions, cyber-theft, denial of service, fire, floods, and other security-related events. According to the SANS Institute, it is a six step process: Preparation, Identification, Containment, Eradication, Recovery, and Lessons Learned.

=== Operations ===
Operational risk management (ORM) is the oversight of operational risk, including the risk of loss resulting from: inadequate or failed internal processes and systems; human factors; or external events. Given the nature of operations, ORM is typically a "continual" process, and will include ongoing risk assessment, risk decision making, and the implementation of risk controls.

=== Petroleum and natural gas ===
For the offshore oil and gas industry, operational risk management is regulated by the safety case regime in many countries. Hazard identification and risk assessment tools and techniques are described in the international standard ISO 17776:2000, and organisations such as the IADC (International Association of Drilling Contractors) publish guidelines for Health, Safety and Environment (HSE) Case development which are based on the ISO standard. Further, diagrammatic representations of hazardous events are often expected by governmental regulators as part of risk management in safety case submissions; these are known as bow-tie diagrams (see Network theory in risk assessment). The technique is also used by organisations and regulators in mining, aviation, health, defence, industrial and finance.

=== Pharmaceutical sector ===
The principles and tools for quality risk management are increasingly being applied to different aspects of pharmaceutical quality systems. These aspects include development, manufacturing, distribution, inspection, and submission/review processes throughout the lifecycle of drug substances, drug products, biological and biotechnological products (including the use of raw materials, solvents, excipients, packaging and labeling materials in drug products, biological and biotechnological products). Risk management is also applied to the assessment of microbiological contamination in relation to pharmaceutical products and cleanroom manufacturing environments.

=== Supply chain ===
Supply chain risk management (SCRM) aims at maintaining supply chain continuity in the event of scenarios or incidents which could interrupt normal business and hence profitability. Risks to the supply chain range from everyday to exceptional, including unpredictable natural events (such as tsunamis and pandemics) to counterfeit products, and reach across quality, security, to resiliency and product integrity. Mitigation of these risks can involve various elements of the business including logistics and cybersecurity, as well as the areas of finance and operations.

=== Travel ===
Travel risk management is concerned with how organisations assess the risks to their staff when travelling, especially when travelling overseas. In the field of international standards, ISO 31030:2021 addresses good practice in travel risk management.

The Global Business Travel Association's education and research arm, the GBTA Foundation. found in 2015 that most businesses covered by their research employed travel risk management protocols aimed at ensuring the safety and well-being of their business travelers. Six key principles of travel risk awareness put forward by the association are preparation, awareness of surroundings and people, keeping a low profile, adopting an unpredictable routine, communications and layers of protection. Traveler tracking using mobile tracking and messaging technologies had by 2015 become a widely used aspect of travel risk management.

== See also ==
- Business continuity
- Catastrophe modeling
- Cost engineering
- Cost-plus contract
- Crossing the river by touching the stones
- Environmental Risk Management Authority, New Zealand
- International Institute of Risk & Safety Management
- Risk Management Framework
- Loss-control consultant
- Moral hazard
- National Safety Council, USA
- Optimism bias
- Pest risk analysis
- Precautionary principle
- Redundancy (engineering)
- Reference class forecasting
- Representative heuristic
- Risk appetite
- Risk aversion
- Risk management tools
- Risk premium
- Roy's safety-first criterion
- Security management
- Social risk management
- Stranded asset
- Supply-chain risk management
- Three lines of defence
- Gordon–Loeb model
