= Intaver Institute =

Software development company

Intaver Institute Inc.
- Company type: Private company
- Industry: Computer Software
- Founded: 2002
- Headquarters: Naples, Florida, United States and Calgary, Alberta, Canada
- Products: RiskyProject Professional; RiskyProject Lite; RiskyProject Enterprise
- Website: www.intaver.com

Intaver Institute is a software development company that develops a suite of project management, risk analysis and risk management applications. Intaver Institute's product is project risk management and risk analysis software suite RiskyProject. Intaver Institute is a privately owned company headquartered in Hendersonville, North Carolina, United States and Calgary, Alberta, Canada.

== Company ==
Intaver Institute Inc. was founded in 2002. Intaver Institute develops quantitative and qualitative risk analysis and risk management software. Particularly Intaver Institute develops software for schedule and cost risk analysis using Event chain methodology. Intaver Institute also performs project management and risk management consulting and training. Intaver Institute published papers and books on project risk management and decision analysis with particular focus on application of psychology of judgement and decision making in project management.

== History ==
In 2004, Intaver launched RiskyProject 1.0 which featured project scheduling, Monte Carlo simulations of project schedules, multiple statistical distributions for task cost and durations, discrete risk event modelling, reporting, and integration with 3rd party project scheduling software. In 2005 Intaver Institute's reseller program launched its reseller program. In 2006 Intaver Institute started academic program, where RiskyProject software was offered with discounts for educational use.

In 2007, Intaver released RiskyProject 2 that included probabilistic and conditional branching, task success rate and crucial tasks analysis, reporting, risk templates, probabilistic calendars, and probabilistic cost analysis charts. In 2009, Intaver released RiskyProject 3 that included an integrated risk register Risk register included risk customizable risk properties, risk categories. RiskyProject 3 also included integration with Microsoft Project using RiskyProject toolbars in Microsoft Project.

In 2010, Intaver release Risky Project 4 that included risk response and mitigation planning. Risk analysis of project cost was significantly improved. This release also included a management of non-schedule risks, such as safety, security, quality, etc. The release included a Microsoft Project 2010 Add-in that allows user to perform Monte Carlo simulations on cost and schedule inside Microsoft Project. In 2012, Intaver released RiskyProject 5 that included upgraded risk management features: history of risk changes, and risk reviews. Probability-Impact risk matrix included risk tolerance customization features and information about risk mitigation. In October 2014, Intaver released version 6 that included a new project portfolio risk management client/server application RiskyProject Enterprise to the existing RiskyProject Professional and Lite. RiskyProject 6 also implemented multiprocessing architecture. In January 2017, Intaver opened new US Headquarters located in Naples, Florida. In June 2017, Intaver released RiskyProject Lite, Professional, and Enterprise 7. In April 2022, Intaver Institute released RiskyProject version 7.2. In March 2026, Intaver Institute released RiskyProject version 8, which features AI-driven risk identification, quantitative analysis of non-schedule risks, improved performance, and an enhanced user interface.

== Products ==
RiskyProject is a suite of project risk analysis and management software that is used to analyse and manage risks across a variety of project types and industries. The RiskyProject suite provides software for both single desktop users to a client/server enterprise system. The RiskyProject suite of products includes RiskyProject Lite, RiskyProject Professional, and RiskyProject Enterprise.

=== RiskyProject Professional and Lite ===
RiskyProject Professional and Lite are desktop software that provides Monte Carlo risk analysis with Event Chain Methodology. Quantitative analysis includes schedule risk, cost risk, and integrated cost and schedule risk. RiskyProject includes an integrated risk register with properties, reviews, and history. Risk assessment tools include a risk matrix and risk scores. Risk response features include mitigation plans with waterfall chart and pre and post-mitigation scores and baselines. RiskyProject includes Microsoft Project Add-in as well integrates with most scheduling software including Oracle Primavera, and others.

=== RiskyProject Enterprise ===
RiskyProject Enterprise is a client/server application launched in January 2014 that adds additional project portfolio risk analysis and management capability when used in conjunction with RiskyProject desktop applications. In addition to the basic features that are found in the desktop software, RiskyProject Enterprise uses the desktop client to provide organization-wide risk registers, project portfolio hierarchies, risk scores and ranking for portfolio, programs, and projects, organization-wide response and mitigation plans, risk analysis using RiskyProject Professional or Lite, and risk approval process based on different user roles and permissions.

== See also ==
- Monte Carlo simulation
- List of project management topics
- Event chain methodology
- Risk register
- Risk Breakdown Structure
