= James Lam =

American corporate director and risk management consultant

- Born: 1961 (age 64–65); Guangzhou, China
- Education: Baruch College (B.B.A., 1983); UCLA Anderson School of Management (M.B.A., 1989)
- Occupations: Corporate director, risk management consultant, author
- Title: President, James Lam & Associates; Independent Director, BlackRock iShares Funds
- Website: https://jameslam.com

James Lam (born 1961) is an American corporate director, management consultant, and author on enterprise risk management. He is president of James Lam & Associates, a risk management consulting firm he founded in 2002. Since April 2024, he has been an independent director of BlackRock iShares Funds and chair of its Risk Committee.

Lam was chief risk officer at GE Capital Markets Services from 1993 to 1995 and the first chief risk officer at Fidelity Investments from 1995 to 1998. He was chair of the Risk Oversight Committee of E*TRADE Financial from 2012 to 2020 and chair of the Audit Committee of RiskLens from 2018 to 2023.

== Early life and education ==
Lam was born in Guangdong, China in 1961 and moved to the United States with his family in 1971. He grew up in Brooklyn and then went on to graduate summa cum laude with a B.B.A. from Baruch College in 1983. He received an M.B.A. with honors from UCLA in 1989.

== Career ==
=== Risk management ===
After graduating from Baruch College in 1983, Lam held positions as a research analyst at Paine Webber, a consultant at Kaplan Smith, vice president at Glendale Federal Bank, and senior consultant at First Manhattan Consulting Group. Between 1993 and 1995, Lam served as chief risk officer at GE Capital Markets Services, where he helped create a new capital markets business.

Lam also served as chief risk officer for Fidelity Investments from 1995 to 1998, as the company's first chief risk officer. His work at Fidelity was profiled in best-practice case studies published in Risk magazine, The Economist, Price Waterhouse Review and Risk and Insurance.

Following his work at GE and Fidelity, Lam joined Oliver Wyman as a partner in 1999. During his tenure at the firm, he founded ERisk, a New York-based cloud and consulting company specializing in ERM and capital management. He initially served as founder and president and later as vice chairman of the board. ERisk was spun off as an independent company in 2001 and acquired by SunGard in 2005.

In 2002, Lam founded James Lam & Associates, a risk management consulting firm.

=== Board memberships ===
Lam has served as an independent director and committee chair on public and private company boards:

- BlackRock iShares Funds — Independent Director; Chair, Risk Committee, April 2024–present
- FAIR Institute — Independent Director, August 2020 – January 2026
- World Gold Trust Services, LLC and WGC USA Asset Management Company, LLC — Independent Director; Audit Committee, September 2023 – March 2024
- RiskLens, Inc. — Independent Director; Chair, Audit Committee, April 2018 – July 2023
- Recology, Inc. — Board Chair; Chair, Audit and Compliance Committees, April 2021 – May 2022
- E*TRADE Financial and E*TRADE Bank — Independent Director; Chair, Risk Oversight Committee, November 2012 – October 2020
- Covarity, Inc. — Independent Director, April 2009 – February 2012
- ERisk, Inc. — Founder; Vice Chairman of the Board, September 2000 – July 2004

=== Academic and advisory work ===
Lam is on the Carnegie Mellon University faculty for its CRO Executive Certification Program, as adjunct faculty since September 2018. He has lectured at Harvard Business School as the subject of a Harvard Business School case study, and has taught graduate courses in risk management and advanced derivatives at Babson College and Hult International Business School.

The Committee of Sponsoring Organizations of the Treadway Commission (COSO) invited Lam to serve on the Advisory Council to update the COSO ERM Framework that was published in 2017.

At the National Association of Corporate Directors (NACD), Lam is a Board Leadership Fellow and is on the faculty for its board training and certification programs.

In March 2025, Lam became Founder and Chief Instructor of the RIMS-CRO Certificate Program in Advanced Enterprise Risk Management, developed with RIMS, the Risk Management Society.

== Publications ==
Lam is the author of two books on enterprise risk management, published by Wiley:

- Enterprise Risk Management: From Incentives to Controls (2003; second edition, 2014)
- Implementing Enterprise Risk Management: From Methods to Applications (2017)

Selected articles include:

- "How Banks Can Finally Get Risk Management Right", Harvard Business Review, April 28, 2023
- "More Is Not Always Better: A Value-Based Approach To Cyber-Risk Oversight", NACD Directorship, March 1, 2018
- "A Board Member's Top Five Recommendations for Cybersecurity and Risk Management", Forbes, October 30, 2017
- "Strategic Risk Management: Optimizing the Risk-Return Profile", Institute of Management Accountants, March 1, 2016
- "Implementing an Effective Risk Appetite", Institute of Management Accountants, August 1, 2015

== Awards and recognition ==
Lam has said he was the first to use the title "chief risk officer", putting the title on his business card while at GE Capital.

- Inaugural Risk Manager of the Year Award, Global Association of Risk Professionals, 1997
- Named one of the "100 Most Influential People in Finance" by Treasury & Risk magazine, 2005, 2006, and 2008
- Named to the NACD Directorship 100, 2017 and 2018
- Named one of Directors & Boards "Directors to Watch", 2017
