= ERMF =

ERMF may refer to:

== Medicine, science and technology ==
- Estimated radiographic magnification factor, for projection radiography

== Business processes ==
- Enterprise risk management framework
