= Risk management tools =

Risk management tools help address uncertainty by identifying risks, generating metrics, setting parameters, prioritizing issues, developing responses, and tracking risks. Without the use of these tools, techniques, documentation, and information systems, it can be challenging to effectively monitor these activities.

There are two distinct types of risk tools identified by their approach: market-level tools using the capital asset pricing model (CAP-M) and component-level tools with probabilistic risk assessment (PRA). Market-level tools use market forces to make risk decisions between securities. Component-level tools use the functions of probability and impact of individual risks to make decisions between resource allocations.

ISO/IEC 31010 (Risk assessment techniques) has a detailed but non-exhaustive list of tools and techniques available for assessing risk.

== Market-level (CAP-M) ==
The capital asset pricing model (CAP-M) uses market or economic statistics and assumptions to determine the appropriate required rate of return of an asset, given that asset's non-diversifiable risk.

== Component-level (PRA) ==
Probabilistic risk assessment is often used in project risk management. These tools are applications of PRA and allow planners to explicitly address uncertainty by identifying and generating metrics, parameterizing, prioritizing, and developing responses, and tracking risk from components, tasks or costs. PRA, also called Likelihood-Consequence or Probability-Impact, is based upon single-point estimates of probability of occurrence, initiating event frequency, and recovery success (e.g., human intervention) of a specific consequence (e.g., cost or schedule delay).

=== Notable PRA tools and techniques ===
- Event chain methodology – A method of managing risk and uncertainties affecting project schedules
- Risk register – A project planning and organizational risk assessment tool. It is often referred to as a Risk Log.
- Systems Analysis Programs for Hands-on Integrated Reliability Evaluations (SAPHIRE) – A probabilistic safety and reliability engineering assessment software tool.

== See also ==
- ISO 31000
- Peren–Clement index
- Problematic integration theory
- Project Management Body of Knowledge
