= ISA 400 Risk Assessments and Internal Control =

ISA 400 Risk Assessments and Internal Control is one of the International Standards on Auditing. It serves to require the auditor to understand the client's accounting system and internal control system and to assess control risk and inherent risk. The objective is to determine the nature, timing and extent of substantive procedures in order to reduce audit risk to an acceptable low level.

ISA 400 talks about the "walk through testing" or auditing in depth test.

This standard was withdrawn in 2004, and has been replaced with the ISA 315, “Understanding the Entity and Its Environment and Assessing the Risks of Material Misstatement” and the ISA 330, “The Auditor’s Procedures in Response to Assessed Risks”

== See also ==
- Control environment
- Sarbanes-Oxley
- Entity-Level Controls
