= Risk register =

Document used as risk management tool, acting as a repository for all identified risks

A Risk register plots the impact of a given risk over of its probability. The presented example deals with some issues which can arise on a usual Saturday-night party.

A risk register is a document used as a risk management tool and to fulfill regulatory compliance, acting as a repository for all risks identified and includes additional information about each risk, e.g., nature of the risk, risk owner, and mitigation measures. It can be displayed as a scatterplot or as a table.

ISO 73:2009 Risk management—Vocabulary defines a risk register to be a "record of information about identified risks".

== Terminology ==
A risk register can contain many different items. There are recommendations for risk register content made by the Project Management Institute Body of Knowledge (PMBOK) and PRINCE2. ISO 31000:2009 does not use the term risk register, however it does state that risks need to be documented.

There are many different tools that can act as risk registers from comprehensive software suites to simple spreadsheets. The effectiveness of these tools depends on their implementation and the organisation's culture.

A typical risk register contains:

- A risk category to group similar risks
- The risk breakdown structure identification number
- A brief description or name of the risk to make the risk easy to discuss
- The impact (or consequence) if the event actually occurs, rated on an integer scale
- The probability or likelihood of its occurrence, rated on an integer scale
- The Risk Score (or Risk Rating) is the product of multiplying probability and impact, and is often used to rank the risks. The UK's National Council for Voluntary Organisations notes that "many experts" argue for a measure which attaches more significance to impact than likelihood, calculated for example by multiplying probability by impact and then adding the impact score again.
- Common mitigation steps (e.g. within IT projects) are Identify, Analyze, Plan Response, Monitor and Control.

The risk register is called "qualitative" if the probabilities are estimated by ranking them, as "high" to "low" impact. It is called "quantitative" both the impact and the probability is put into numbers, e.g. a risk might have a "$1m" impact and a "50%" probability.

Contingent response - the actions to be taken should the risk event actually occur.

Contingency - the budget allocated to the contingent response

Trigger - an event that itself results in the risk event occurring (for example the risk event might be "flooding" and "heavy rainfall" the trigger)

== Criticism ==
Although risk registers are commonly used tools not only in projects and programs but also in companies, research has found that they can lead to dysfunctions, for instance Toyota's risk register listed reputation risks caused by Prius' malfunctions but the company failed to take action. Risk registers often lead to ritualistic decision-making, illusion of control, and the fallacy of misplaced concreteness: mistaking the map for the territory. However, if used with common sense, risk registers are a useful tool to stimulate cross-functional debate and cooperation.

== Example ==
Risk register of the project "barbecue party" with somebody inexperienced handling the grill, both in table format (below) and as plot (right).

Category	Name	RBS ID	Probability	Impact	Mitigation	Contingency	Risk Score after Mitigation	Action By	Action When
Guests	The guests find the party boring	1.1.	low	medium	Invite crazy friends, provide sufficient liquor	Bring out the karaoke	2		within 2hrs
Guests	Drunken brawl	1.2.	medium	low	Don’t invite crazy friends, don't provide too much liquor	Call 911	x		Immediately
Nature	Rain	2.1.	low	high	Have the party indoors	Move the party indoors	0		10mins
Nature	Fire	2.2.	highest	highest	Start the party with instructions on what to do in the event of fire	Implement the appropriate response plan	1	Everyone	As per plan
Food	Not enough food	3.1.	high	high	Have a buffet	Order pizza	1		30mins
Food	Food is spoiled	3.2.	high	highest	Store the food in deep freezer	Order pizza	1		30mins

== See also ==
- Risk
- Event chain methodology
- Risk Breakdown Structure
- Risk management tools
- Issue log
- Failure mode and effects analysis
- Failure mode, effects, and criticality analysis
- PRINCE2, utilizes a risk register
