= Control environment =

A control environment, also called internal control environment, is a term of financial audit, internal audit and enterprise risk management. It means the overall attitude, awareness and actions of directors and management (i.e. "those charged with governance") regarding the internal control system and its importance to the entity. They express it in management style, corporate culture, values, philosophy and operating style, the organisational structure, and human resources policies and procedures.

== See also ==
- ISA 400 Risk Assessments and Internal Control
- Entity-level control, a control that helps to ensure that management directives pertaining to the entire entity are carried out
