= Mitigating control =

A mitigating control is type of control used in auditing to discover and prevent mistakes that may lead to uncorrected and/or unrecorded misstatements that would generally be related to control deficiencies. For example, a Company's financial accounting may fail to record a financial transaction and the error may go unnoticed for several reporting periods. A mitigating control would be instrumental in finding and therefore, preventing such mistakes. If a key control fails and a mitigating control is in place, it may prevent the resulting potential financial statement error from becoming material.
