= Going concern =

Term for a functioning business

A going concern is an accounting term for a business that is assumed will meet its financial obligations when they become due. It functions without the threat of liquidation for the foreseeable future, which is usually regarded as at least the next 12 months or the specified accounting period (the longer of the two). The presumption of going concern for the business implies the basic declaration of intention to keep operating its activities at least for the next year, which is a basic assumption for preparing financial statements that comprehend the conceptual framework of the IFRS. Hence, a declaration of going concern means that the business has neither the intention nor the need to liquidate or to materially curtail the scale of its operations.

Continuation of an entity as a going concern is presumed as the basis for financial reporting unless and until the entity's liquidation becomes imminent. Preparation of financial statements under this presumption is commonly referred to as the going concern basis of accounting. If and when an entity's liquidation becomes imminent, financial statements are prepared under the liquidation basis of accounting (Financial Accounting Standards Board, 2014).

== Definition ==
The going concern assumption is universally understood and accepted by accounting professionals; however, it has never been formally incorporated into U.S. GAAP. In October 2008, FASB issued an Exposure Draft called "Going Concern." It discusses the following possible pronouncements for the going concern:

- Reconsideration of defining and incorporating the terms going concern and substantial doubt into U.S. GAAP
- The time horizon over which management would evaluate the entity's ability to meet its obligations
- The type of information that management should consider in evaluating the entity's ability to meet its obligations
- The effect of subsequent events on management's evaluation of the entity's ability to meet its obligations
- Whether to provide guidance on the liquidation basis of accounting

A current definition of the going concern assumption can be found in the AICPA Statement on Auditing Standards No.1 Codification of Auditing Standards and Procedures, Section 341, “The Auditor’s Consideration of an Entity’s Ability to Continue as a Going Concern” (AU Section 341). The "going concern" concept assumes that the business will remain in existence long enough for all the assets of the business to be fully utilized. Utilized assets means obtaining the complete benefit from their earning potential (i.e. if you recently purchased equipment costing $5,000 that had 5 years of productive/useful life, then under the going concern assumption, the accountant would only write off one year's value $1,000 (1/5th) this year, leaving $4,000 to be treated as a fixed asset with future economic value for the business).

In the UK and Republic of Ireland, the Financial Reporting Standards define that: "An entity is a going concern unless management either intends to liquidate the entity or to cease trading, or has no realistic alternative but to do so." These also define that: "In assessing whether the going concern assumption is appropriate, management takes into account all available information about the future, which is at least, but is not limited to, 12 months from the date when the financial statements are authorised for issue." This is intended to set a very high threshold for not reporting as a going concern, and the reporting standards allow for accounts to be published on a going concern basis, with appropriate disclosures, where "significant judgement" was needed to reach the conclusion that the going concern was appropriate or where "material uncertainty related to going concern" exists. An explicit statement is also required that accounts have been prepared on a going concern basis.

== Accounting ==
The going concern principle allows the company to defer some of its prepaid expenses until future accounting periods. The going concern assumption is a fundamental assumption in the preparation of financial statements. Under the going concern assumption, an entity is ordinarily viewed as continuing in business for the foreseeable future with neither the intention nor the necessity of liquidation, ceasing trading or seeking protection from creditors pursuant to laws or regulations. Accordingly, unless the going concern assumption is inappropriate in the circumstances of the entity, assets and liabilities are recorded on the basis that the entity will be able to realize its assets, discharge its liabilities, and obtain refinancing (if necessary) in the normal course of business.

An entity is assumed to be a going concern in the absence of significant information to the contrary. An example of such contrary information is an entity's inability to meet its obligations as they come due without substantial asset sales or debt restructurings. If such were not the case, an entity would essentially be acquiring assets with the intention of closing its operations and reselling the assets to another party.

If the accountant believes that an entity may no longer be a going concern, then this brings up the issue of whether its assets are impaired, which may call for the write-down of their carrying amount to their liquidation value, and/or the recognition of liabilities that arise on account of the entity's imminent closure (which may not arise otherwise). Thus, the value of an entity that is assumed to be a going concern is higher than its breakup value, since a going concern can potentially continue to earn profits.

The going concern concept is not clearly defined anywhere in the US generally accepted accounting principles, and so is subject to a considerable amount of interpretation regarding when an entity should report it. However, generally accepted auditing standards (GAAS) do instruct an auditor regarding the consideration of an entity's ability to continue as a going concern.

The auditor evaluates an entity's ability to continue as a going concern for a period not less than one year following the date of the financial statements being audited (a longer period may be considered if the auditor believes such extended period to be relevant). The auditor considers such items as negative trends in operating results, loan defaults, denial of trade credit from suppliers uneconomical long-term commitments, and legal proceedings in deciding if there is a substantial doubt about an entity's ability to continue as a going concern. If so, the auditor must draw attention to the uncertainty regarding the entity's ability to continue as a going concern, in their auditor's report. On the other hand, inappropriate use of the going concern assumption by an entity may cause the auditor to issue an adverse opinion on the financial statements. This Guidance provides a framework to assist directors, audit committees and finance teams in determining whether it is appropriate to adopt the going concern basis for preparing financial statements and in making balanced, proportionate and clear disclosures. Separate standards and guidance have been issued by the Auditing Practices Board to address the work of auditors in relation to going concern.

=== Assumption ===
Under the going concern assumption, an entity is viewed as continuing in business for the foreseeable future. General purpose financial statements are prepared on a going concern basis, unless management either intends to liquidate the entity or to cease operations, or has no realistic alternative but to do so. Special purpose financial statements may or may not be prepared in accordance with a financial reporting framework for which the going concern basis is relevant (for example, the going concern basis is not relevant for some financial statements prepared on a tax basis in particular jurisdictions). When the use of the going concern assumption is appropriate, assets and liabilities are recorded on the basis that the entity will be able to realize its assets and discharge its liabilities in the normal course of business.

== Standards and guidance ==
Under the International Standards on Auditing, auditors evaluate the appropriateness of management’s use of the going concern basis and conclude whether a material uncertainty exists; ISA 570 (Revised) also prescribes specific reporting when such uncertainties are present (effective for periods ending on or after 15 December 2016). In the United States, the FASB requires management to assess and, when necessary, disclose going-concern uncertainties for the one-year period after the date the financial statements are issued (or available to be issued) (ASC 205-40), introduced by ASU 2014-15. For audits of U.S. issuers, the PCAOB requires auditors to evaluate whether substantial doubt exists about an entity’s ability to continue as a going concern and to appropriately modify the auditor’s report (AS 2415).

== Use in risk management ==
If a public or private company reports that its auditors have doubts about its ability to continue as a going concern, investors may take that as a sign of increased risk, although an emphasis of matter paragraph in an audit report does not necessarily indicate that a company is on the verge of insolvency. Despite this, some fund managers may be required to sell the stock to maintain an appropriate level of risk in their portfolios. A negative judgment may also result in the breach of bank loan covenants or lead a debt rating firm to lower the rating on the company's debt, making the cost of existing debt increase and/or preventing the company from obtaining additional debt financing. Because of such responses to expressed concerns by auditors, in the 1970s, the American Institute of Certified Public Accountants' Cohen commission concluded that an auditor's expression of uncertainty about the entity's ability to continue as a going concern "tends to be a self-fulfilling prophecy. The auditor's expression of uncertainty about the company's ability to continue may contribute to making its failure a certainty." Businesses should also communicate with business advisors as well as their auditors in the time of trouble. Communication can let advisors and auditors help when needed. They can help business review their internal risk management along with other internal controls.

== See also ==
- [Source 2012 PCAOB Survey] If it is concluded by either the independent auditor, or management or both that the company may not be a going concern, what disclosures should be provided to investors?
  - A reasonably detailed discussion of the company's ability to generate sufficient cash to support its operations during at least the twelve months from the date of the financial statements. Expected courses of action that bear on financial flexibility of the company such as:
    - [Note: Search for this discussion in three locations: Auditor's report, Management discussion and analysis and Notes to financial statements. The going concert opinion is forward looking, therefore its highly suggested that 10-K and 10-Q reports be searched on the term "Risk Factor" for important forward looking risk disclosures. For abbreviated background see: Reg S-K Item 503 and 10-K Risk Factors]
    - New borrowings. (See topics such as Financial distress, Distressed lending, Death spiral financing, Factoring, debt restructuring, Debt, Loan, Money markets)
    - Raising of new capital. (See Capital market, Financial capital)
    - Liquidating of assets. (See Liquidation value, Fire sale)
    - Reducing costs. (See Cost reduction)
    - Reducing dividends. (See Dividend)
    - Reducing levels of services or products. (See Restructuring, Layoff)
    - Filing for bankruptcy
- Going concern status is typically tightly related to, and intertwined with, an issuers deteriorating credit rating(s)
  - Corporate credit ratings
  - Credit rating agency and Criticism
- Concentration of large firms issuing going concern opinions has been raised as a systemic risk. See Big Four (audit firms) PwC, Deloitte, Ernst & Young, and KPMG
- Concentration of large firms issuing credit opinions has also been raised as a systemic risk. See Big Three (credit rating agencies) Standard & Poor's, Moody's Investor Service, and Fitch Ratings
- Going concern status often triggers a technical default. See discussion at Types of Default. This can mean unused lines of credit and Unsecured debt facilities dry up.
  - Going concern status may become a self fulfilling prophecy

== See also ==
- Outline of corporate finance
