= EQUITABLE Act =

Failed US bill to regulate foreign securities

The Ensuring Quality Information and Transparency for Abroad-Based Listings on our Exchanges Act (EQUITABLE Act) was a proposed bill to amend the Sarbanes-Oxley Act to require the U.S. Securities and Exchange Commission to de-list foreign companies traded on U.S. stock exchanges that do not comply with oversight and audit rules. Under the bipartisan bill, foreign companies traded on U.S. stock exchanges that refused to allow the Public Company Accounting Oversight Board to inspect their financial records would face de-listing. The bill was introduced in 2019 by Marco Rubio and co-sponsored by Bob Menendez, Tom Cotton, and Kirsten Gillibrand. The bill was a response to the lack of financial transparency of Chinese companies listed on U.S. stock exchanges, often resulting from reverse mergers, and defrauding of investors.

== See also ==
- Holding Foreign Companies Accountable Act
- The China Hustle
- Luckin Coffee § 2020–2021: Accounting scandal
