= Political positions of Marco Rubio =

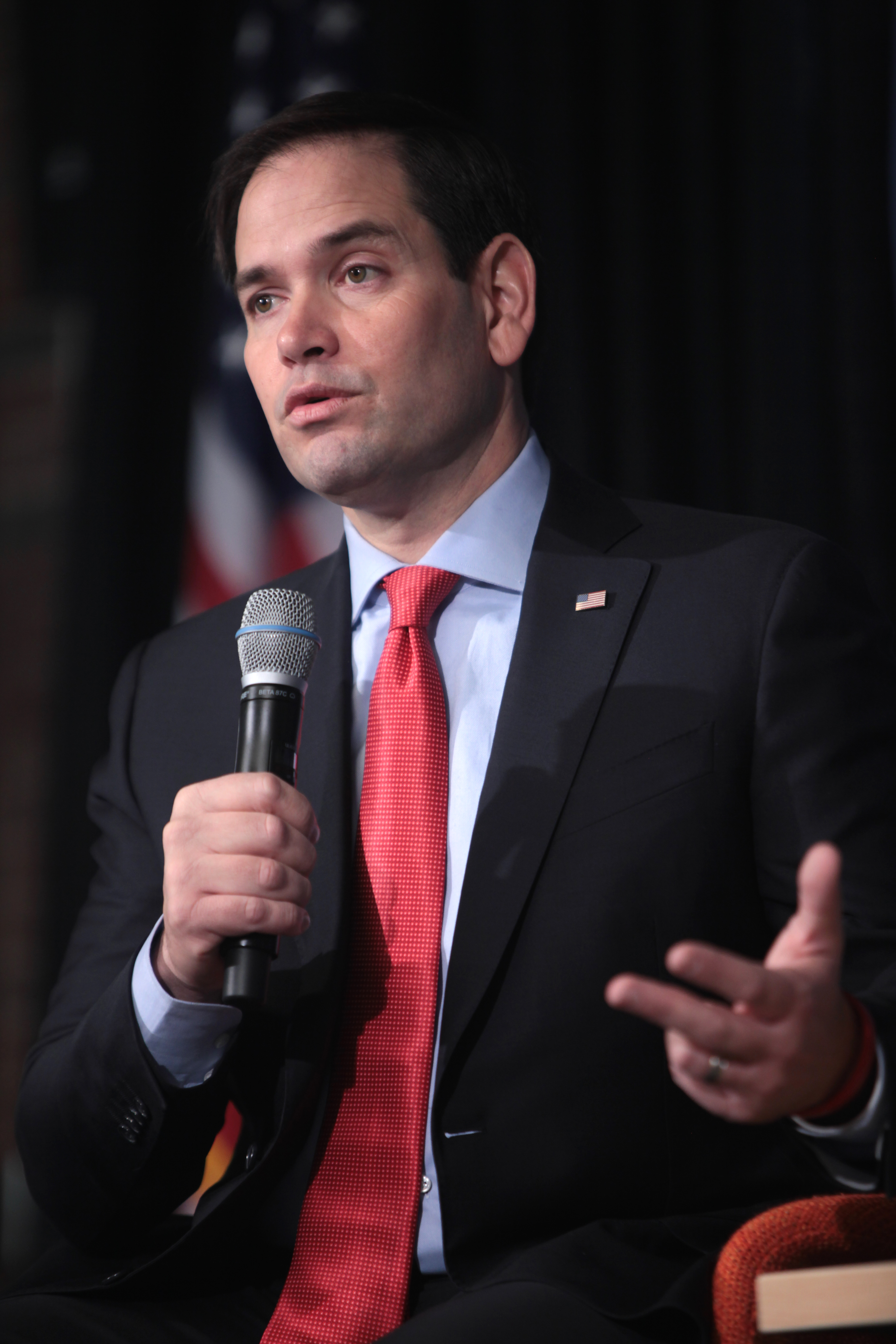
Rubio speaking at an event in Manchester, New Hampshire, 2016

Marco Rubio (/ˈruːbioʊ/; born May 28, 1971) is an American politician, diplomat, and attorney serving since 2025 as the 72nd United States Secretary of State. He was a Republican United States Senator from Florida. Rubio was a candidate for the Republican nomination for president of the United States in the 2016 election.

Rubio supports balancing the federal budget while prioritizing defense spending. He believes that humans are contributing to climate change, but questions the extent to which the United States is responsible for it, claiming that other nations, such as the People's Republic of China, are primarily responsible. He wants to repeal the Affordable Care Act, replacing it with tax credits and less regulation. He opposes net neutrality. Regarding immigration, he supports "securing the country's borders," offering a path to citizenship to some undocumented immigrants, and increasing vetting requirements of refugees. Rubio identifies as pro-life. On taxes, Rubio says he would set corporate taxes to 25 percent and cap economic regulations. Rubio opposed the Obama administration's normalization of relations with Cuba. Rubio supports increased sanctions on Iran and opposed the Iran Nuclear Deal.

During the Syrian war, Rubio opposed accepting Syrian refugees because he believed background checks could not be done under the conditions of the time. He supported working with allies to set up no-fly zones in Syria to protect civilians from Bashar al-Assad. He also favors mass government surveillance of the American population and has stated that gun control laws fail to achieve their purpose. He is supportive of the Trans-Pacific Partnership because it is his belief that the U.S. risks exclusion from global trade unless it is more open to trade. He is very hawkish with China regarding national security and human rights; he supports increased U.S. military presence in that region. On capital punishment, Rubio favors "streamlining the appeals process" so that the death penalty can occur more frequently.

== Broad overview of political stance ==
As of early 2015, Rubio had a 98.67 rating by the American Conservative Union, based on his lifetime voting record in the Senate. According to the National Journal, in 2013 Rubio had been the 17th most conservative senator. The Club for Growth gave Rubio ratings of 93 percent and 91 percent based on his voting record in 2014 and 2013 respectively, and he has a lifetime rating from the organization above 90 percent.

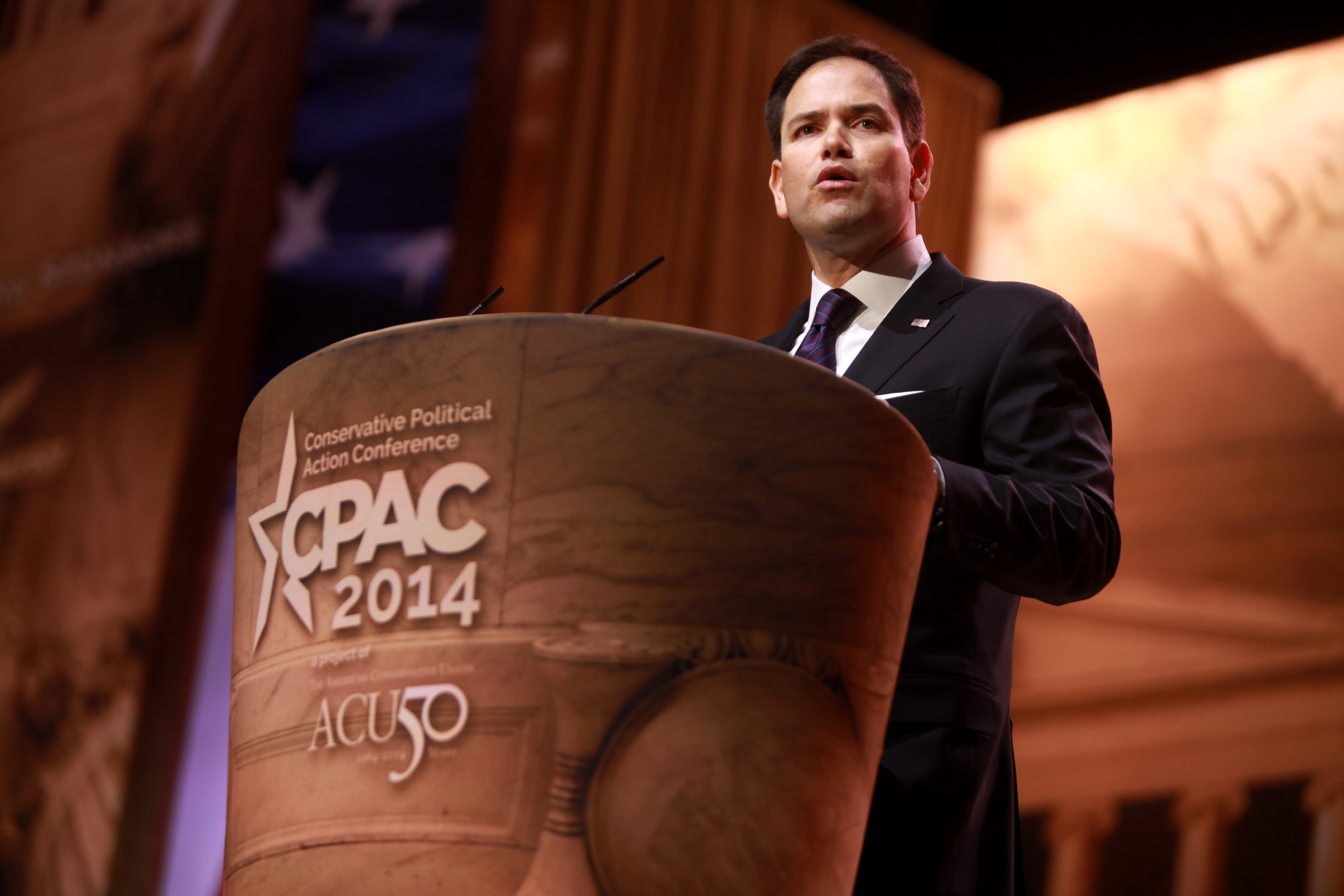
Senator Rubio speaking at the 2014 Conservative Political Action Conference (CPAC) in National Harbor, Maryland

Rubio initially won his U.S. Senate seat with strong Tea Party support, but his 2013 support for comprehensive immigration reform legislation led to a decline in that support. Rubio's stance on military, foreign policy and national security issues — such as his support for arming the Syrian rebels and for the NSA — alienated some libertarian-leaning Tea Party activists.

== Drug policy and criminal justice reform ==
Rubio supports continued criminal penalties for recreational cannabis use. In January 2014, he said: "I don't think legalizing marijuana or even decriminalizing it is the right decision for our country." In a May 2014 interview, Rubio said there is "no responsible way to recreationally use" marijuana and that legalization of the drug would be "bad for the country". Rubio said that he only supports the use of cannabis for medical purposes if it is the non-psychoactive type (such as "Charlotte's web") approved by the Florida legislature, and that a 2014 ballot measure to legalize medical use in Florida was a "ruse". Rubio has said that as president he would enforce federal law in states that have legalized cannabis.

Regarding the legalization of drugs in general, Rubio has stated, "I personally believe that legalizing drugs would be a great mistake and that any reductions in sentences for drug crimes should be made with great care." He also said that "too often" the conversation about criminal justice reform "starts and ends with drug policy". In 2018, he was one of 12 senators to vote against the First Step Act, a criminal justice reform bill signed into law by President Trump.

== Education ==
=== K-12 ===
As a legislator, Rubio was active in pursuing K–12 policy including introducing the Educational Opportunities Act in 2013. As a presidential candidate, Rubio has argued for closing the federal Department of Education, expanding public charter schools, and for teaching both creationism and evolution.

Additionally, Rubio has taken a strong stance against the Common Core State Standards, arguing that, while they "started out as [a] well-intentioned effort to develop more rigorous curriculum standards", that they will eventually be "used to force on states policies the federal government wants".

=== Post-secondary ===
Rubio has proposed a plan to reform the country's higher education system, which includes: expanded vocational and apprenticeship programs; a proposed "Student Right to Know Before You Go Act," which would require colleges to inform students prior to taking out loans of the future income they could expect after obtaining a degree; a proposal to automatically base student loan payments on subsequent income; and, enabling students to partner with investors who would receive a percentage of the students' income in return for funding their education. The plan also included a commitment to create a new college accreditation program in the first 100 days of Rubio's administration had he been elected in 2016.

Rubio has supported President Donald Trump's effort to crack down on pro-Palestinian protesters on university campuses saying, he has removed the visas of "Maybe more than 300 at this point, We do it every day, every time I find one of these lunatics."

== Gun policy ==
As of 2016, Rubio had an A+ grade from the NRA's Political Victory Fund. He has stated that the Second Amendment is a cornerstone of American democracy.

However, he voted for a gun ban in Florida Public Parks in 1999, and, as Florida Speaker of the House, Rubio failed to push a law allowing guns at work. He believes that gun control laws generally fail to achieve their purpose.

In the wake of the Stoneman Douglas High School shooting, Rubio stated that he does not support arming teachers to address the frequency of school shootings in the United States, calling it "a terrible idea".

Rubio opposes banning assault weapons, stating that if he believed that such a ban "would have prevented this from happening, I would have supported it." In contrast, Rubio does support legislation that would prevent those under the age of 18 from purchasing assault weapons.

Rubio also supports modifying the current system of background checks for purchasing guns, as well as legislation to ban bump stocks. Rubio has announced his support for gun-violence restraining orders and said that he is reconsidering his support of high-capacity magazines — though he stopped short of taking a firm stance. At a town hall meeting in February 2018, Rubio stated, "I support lifting the age from 18 to 21 for buying a rifle."

In January 2019, Rubio was one of 31 Republican senators to cosponsor the Constitutional Concealed Carry Reciprocity Act, a bill introduced by John Cornyn and Ted Cruz that would grant individuals with concealed carry privileges in their home state the right to exercise this right in any other state with concealed carry laws while concurrently abiding by that state's laws.

== Energy and environment ==
Before 2018, Rubio rejected the scientific consensus that human activity is the main cause of climate change, stating "there is no consensus on ... how much of the changes that are going on are due to human activity," and that proposals to address climate change would be ineffective and economically harmful. The website PolitiFact had said that Rubio "consistently either avoids the link between human activity and climate change, or outright denies it." By his second term as senator, Rubio had acknowledged that humans contribute to greenhouse gases, and that sea levels are rising at a measurable rate, commenting on the Green New Deal, "While Earth’s climate is changing, there is no credible scenario that will lead to the destruction — or salvation — of the planet within 10 to 12 years, as some Green New Deal proponents allege. Also true: Communities and local businesses in my home state of Florida are already dealing with the very real impacts of rising sea levels, and yet, the Green New Deal will do nothing to address that reality". Rubio believes that other nations like China are mainly responsible for climate change.

In response to the encyclical Laudato si' by Pope Francis in 2015, in which Francis warns of the dangers of climate change, Rubio, a Roman Catholic, replied: "I have no problem with what the pope did" and "[Pope Francis] is a moral authority and as a moral authority is reminding us of our obligation to be good caretakers to the planet. I'm a political leader. And my job as a policymaker is to act in the common good. And I do believe it's in the common good to protect our environment, but I also believe it's in the common good to protect our economy."

During his 2016 presidential run, Rubio called for ending the crude oil export ban, block the Environmental Protection Agency's Clean Power Plan for reducing carbon emissions, and expand the use of coal, natural gas, and hydraulic fracturing. He avoided saying the words "climate change" in his environmental plan.

During Obama's presidency, Rubio said that Environmental Protection Agency rules were too burdensome, and called for reversing some of the administration's environmental policies.

As reported by The Hill in 2018, Jeanette Nuñez will introduce legislation in Florida "to standardize daylight saving time for the entire calendar year". To make the "Sunshine Protection Act" nationwide, Senator Marco Rubio would sponsor such a bill in the Senate given the bill could not take effect until the federal government makes the change. This is because the "provision would shift the state into a different time zone permanently", something which requires a federal regulatory action or an act of Congress.

In March 2019, Rubio was an original cosponsor of a bipartisan bill intended to mandate the Environmental Protection Agency declare per- and polyfluoroalkyl substances as hazardous substances that could be addressed with cleanup funds via the EPA Superfund law in addition to forming a requirement that polluters undertake or pay for remediation within a year of the bill being enacted.

The League of Conservation Voters gave Rubio a lifetime score of 9% for votes on environmental issues.

== Government regulation and the internet ==
Rubio has stated that he would cap government regulation on businesses. He has praised 'on-demand' businesses, such as Uber and Airbnb, as drivers of innovation that should be protected from government interference, and criticized efforts by New York City to limit those businesses.

In an op-ed for Politico, Rubio criticized net neutrality laws for expanding government control over the Internet and applying "a 1930s law to a 21st century issue". As alternatives to net neutrality laws that ban different prices for different types of content, Rubio has pointed to a resolution he proposed with Senator Claire McCaskill (D-MO) opposing international efforts to grant greater control over the Internet to the International Telecommunication Union, as well as proposed legislation to increase mobile broadband by "expanding unlicensed spectrum".

Rubio has praised encryption and criticized the idea of forcing Apple Inc. to create a backdoor to encryption to the iPhone in the wake of the 2015 San Bernardino attack, claiming that it would open the door to criminals accessing smartphones and would merely result in terrorists switching to foreign encrypted software to which there was no backdoor.

== Healthcare ==
Rubio has stated that he would repeal the Affordable Care Act, and replace it with tax credits and less regulation. In an opinion piece on the website Politico, Rubio proposed an up-front tax credit to be used for health insurance, along with federally-supported, state-based high-risk pools for those with pre-existing conditions to purchase health insurance and the expansion of health savings accounts (HSAs). The plan also calls for Medicaid to be funded through per-capita block grants to states, which would eliminate federal mandates, while Medicare would be transitioned into a premium support system, like Medicare Advantage and Medicare Part D.

Rubio pushed for the elimination of the "risk corridors" used by the federal government to compensate insurers for their losses as part of the Patient Protection and Affordable Care Act (PPACA). The risk corridors were intended to be funded by profitable insurers participating in the PPACA. However, since insurer losses have significantly exceeded their profits in the program, the risk corridors have been depleted. His efforts contributed to the insertion of a provision in the 2014 federal budget that forbids Health and Human Services from using "any money other than what came from profitable insurers." One of the many insurers who suffered financially because of the elimination of the risk corridor program, Moda Health took the case to court and won a "$214-million judgment against the federal government" in Health Plan, Inc. v. The United States. On February 10, 2017, Judge Thomas C. Wheeler stated, "the Government "made a promise in the risk corridors program that it has yet to fulfill. Today, the court directs the Government to fulfill that promise. After all, 'to say to [Moda], 'The joke is on you. You shouldn't have trusted us,' is hardly worthy of our great government." On April 27, 2020, the US Supreme Court voted 8–1 to require the federal government to pay $12 billion to insurance companies.

== Immigration ==
On immigration, Rubio supports securing the country's borders and then offering legal status to people who came to the United States unlawfully, and he also believes there should be more vetting of refugees; he now opposes seeking a single comprehensive all-in-one immigration reform bill (which he calls delusional), and instead wants to secure the borders and only then discuss legal status. Rubio is opposed to allowing refugees of the Syrian Civil War to seek refuge in the United States because background checks cannot be performed under present circumstances.

As part of the bipartisan "Gang of Eight" in the Senate, Rubio co-authored the Border Security, Economic Opportunity, and Immigration Modernization Act of 2013 to give illegal immigrants a pathway to legal status. His proposal contrasted with the Republican party's long-held view that offering citizenship to undocumented immigrants is virtually the same as amnesty. In October 2013, four months after the Senate passed the bill he co-authored, Rubio publicly opposed its passage in the House of Representatives, proposing instead a series of individual bills.

Rubio now advocates stopping illegal immigration before addressing those illegal immigrants who are already in the country. In an interview in September 2015 he stated: "I don't think it's a decision you have to make on the front end. The first two things you have to do is stop illegal immigration, then second you have to modernize our legal immigration system, and then third you can have a debate about how to even legalize people to begin with. And then ultimately in 10 or 12 years you could have a broader debate about how has this worked out and should we allow some of them to apply for green cards and eventually citizenship."

In addressing his change of posture, at the annual Conservative Political Action Conference in 2015, Rubio stated that his biggest lesson from the failure to enact comprehensive immigration reform was that Americans would not support it until the border is secure.

In March 2019, Rubio was one of 12 Republican senators to vote to block President Trump's national emergency declaration that would have granted him access to $3.6 billion in military construction funding to build border barriers.

=== Grandfather who fled Cuba in 1962 ===
The New York Times reported in March 2016 that "Marco Rubio's policies might shut the door to people like his grandfather." Rubio has acknowledged that some people might see a conflict between his immigration positions and the experience of his maternal grandfather, Pedro Victor Garcia. Garcia initially immigrated legally to the U.S. in 1956 but returned to Cuba to find work in 1959. When he fled to the U.S. in 1962 without a visa, he was detained as an undocumented immigrant, and an immigration judge initially ordered him deported, but later the same day immigration officials had a "change of heart", resulting in status as a "parolee". The Times calls that status "a gray area of the law that meant he would not get a green card but could remain in the United States".

Rubio supports immigration rules that are different than the rules that were in place as of 1962, saying that there was not a "widespread effort on behalf of Fidel Castro to infiltrate into the United States killers who were going to detonate weapons and kill people." Rubio says there should be exceptions for people who obviously pose no threat. Upon arriving in the U.S. in 1962, Pedro Victor Garcia was five feet 6 inches, 120 pounds, with a leg injury, polio, scoliosis and signs of emphysema; pity may have been the factor that swayed immigration officials to let him stay. A Rubio spokesman has said that refugees often arrive without all the necessary visas, but that the U.S. permitted Cubans to stay.

Rubio was born in 1971, long after Garcia's arrival in 1962, and Garcia lived until 1984; Rubio says, "I learned at his feet, relied on his counsel and craved his respect". Rubio said in 2012 that he never had any knowledge that his grandfather was in the U.S. illegally. According to the Times, immigration officials told Garcia in 1962 that "he could stay for the time being", and he obtained permanent residency in 1967.

== International relations and security ==
Rubio has called for a more active presence of the United States in global affairs and "a robust American role in confronting" Iran, Russia and North Korea. Rubio disparaged Russian president Vladimir Putin as a "gangster" and "an organized crime figure that runs a country". He has opposed efforts by the Obama administration to normalize political relations with Cuba. Rubio also opposes the Joint Comprehensive Plan of Action deal with Iran's nuclear program (which was partially brokered by the Obama administration) and has stated that he would continue to increase sanctions against Iran until it agreed to end its uranium enrichment program, and has pointed to the possibility of military action to prevent Iran from acquiring nuclear weapons. Rubio is known for his very hawkish views in regard to China and also strongly supports Taiwan and its independence.

=== Africa ===
==== Libya ====
In March 2011, Rubio supported U.S. participation in the military campaign in Libya to oust Libyan leader Muammar Gaddafi. He urged that Senate leaders bring "a bi-partisan resolution to the Senate floor authorizing the president's decision to participate in allied military action in Libya".

=== Asia ===
==== China ====
Weeks after the 2014 Hong Kong class boycott campaign and Umbrella Movement broke out which demands genuine universal suffrage among other goals, Rubio among bipartisan colleagues joined U.S. Senator Sherrod Brown and Rep. Chris Smith's effort to introduce Hong Kong Human Rights and Democracy Act which would update the United States–Hong Kong Policy Act of 1992 and U.S. commitment to Hong Kong's freedom and democracy. "China remains... suppressing dissent and preventing democracy in Hong Kong.... The U.S. should make clear that we stand on the side of the democratic aspirations of the people of Hong Kong and against attempts to suppress their voices.... help to ensure that Hong Kong remains truly autonomous from Beijing." Rubio said.

In November 2017, in response to efforts by the People's Republic of China (PRC) to purchase tech companies based in the US, Rubio was one of nine senators to cosponsor a bill that would broaden the federal government's ability to prevent foreign purchases of U.S. firms through increasing the strength of the Committee on Foreign Investment in the United States (CFIUS). The scope of the CFIUS would be expanded to allow it to review along with possibly decline smaller investments and add additional national security factors for CFIUS to consider including if information about Americans would be exposed as part of transactions or whether the deal would facilitate fraud.

On August 28, 2018, Rubio and 16 other members of Congress urged the U.S. to impose sanctions under the Global Magnitsky Act against Chinese officials responsible for human rights abuses against the Uyghur Muslim minority in Xinjiang.

In November 2018, Rubio and a bipartisan group of senators sent a letter to the Trump administration, raising concerns about China’s undue influence over media outlets and academic institutions in the United States. They wrote: "In American news outlets, Beijing has used financial ties to suppress negative information about the CCP. In the past four years, multiple media outlets with direct or indirect financial ties to the PRC allegedly decided not to publish stories on wealth and corruption in the CCP...Beijing has also sought to use relationships with American academic institutions and student groups to shape public discourse."

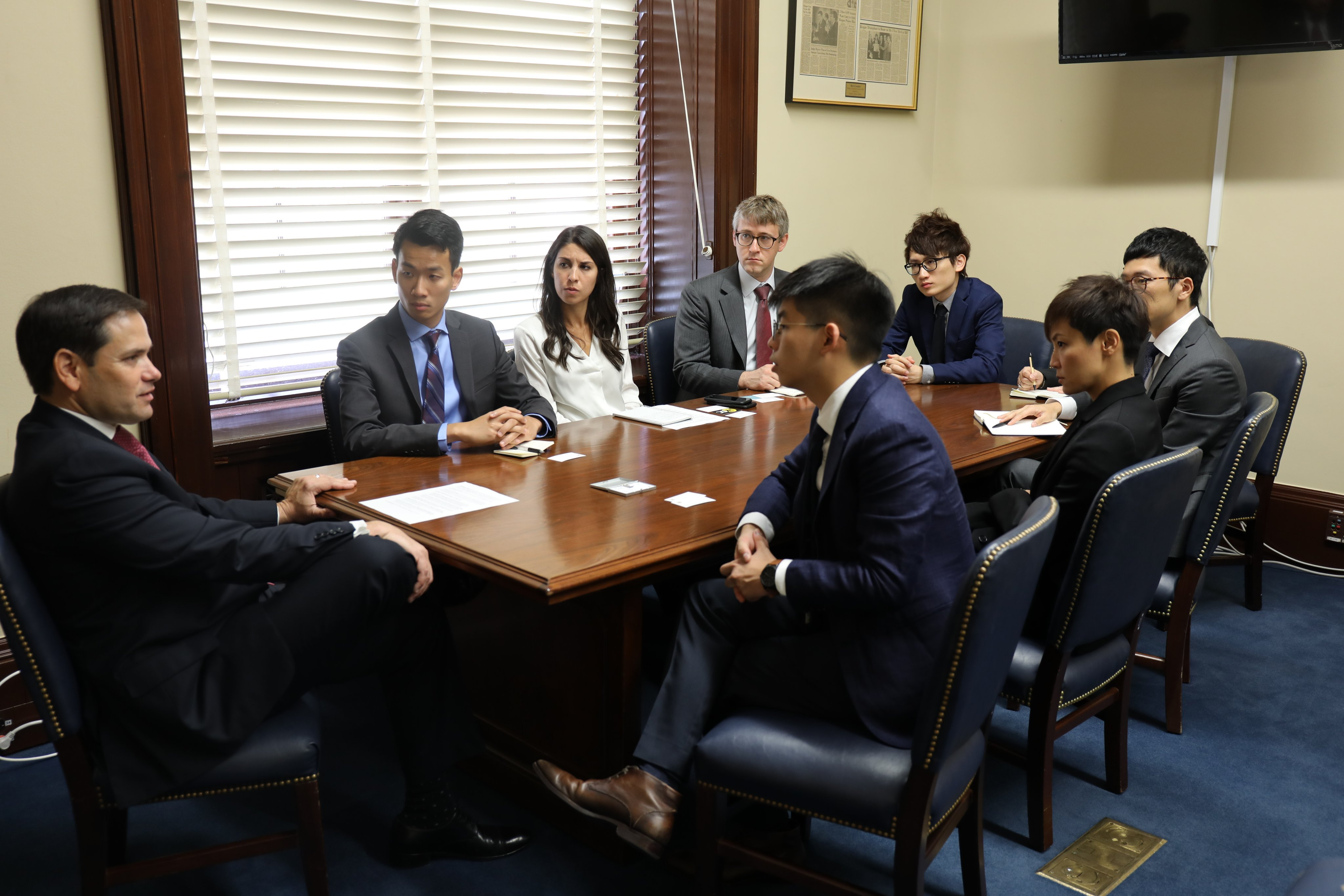
Rubio with Hong Kong activists who have become prominent figures in the 2019–20 Hong Kong protests

In January 2019, Rubio and Democrat Mark Warner introduced legislation creating the Office of Critical Technology and Security at the White House that would serve the purpose of organizing efforts to protect technology across the federal government. Rubio said in a statement, "China continues to conduct a coordinated assault on U.S. intellectual property, U.S. businesses, and our government networks and information with the full backing of the Chinese Communist Part." He furthered that the US needed "a more coordinated approach to directly counter this critical threat and ensure" better protection of American technology and that the bill would "help protect the United States by streamlining efforts across the government."

In February 2019, Rubio proposed legislation restricting and taxing Chinese investment in the United States as a means of countering Beijing's "Made in China 2025" (MIC2025) industrial modernization program.

In October 2019, American video game company Activision Blizzard punished a Hong Kong-based professional gamer for supporting pro-democracy Hong Kong protests. Rubio accused Blizzard of censorship.

On July 13, 2020, Rubio, along with three other U.S. politicians, was sanctioned by the Chinese government for "interfering in China’s internal affairs" through their condemnation of human rights abuses in Xinjiang. On August 10, 2020, Rubio, along with 10 other U.S. individuals, was sanctioned by the Chinese government for "behaving badly on Hong Kong-related issues". The sanctions ban him from traveling to the country.

In January 2021, Rubio sponsored the Uyghur Forced Labor Prevention Act. In May 2021, Rubio argued that "Wall Street must stop enabling Communist China" in The American Prospect and on his website. "Americans from across the political spectrum should feel emboldened by the growing bipartisan awakening to the threat that the CCP poses to American workers, families, and communities", he wrote. "As we deploy legislative solutions to tackle this challenge, Democrats must not allow our corporate and financial sectors' leftward shift on social issues to blind them to the enormity of China as a geo-economic threat."

He condemned hosting the 2022 Winter Olympics in China, saying "While we pray for the health, safety, and success of all American athletes, we cannot forget that hiding behind the pageantry and fanfare is an evil, genocidal regime. Until the Chinese Communist Party puts an end to all ethnic cleansing, slave labor practices, and political oppression, I will work to ensure that the Olympics are never hosted in the People’s Republic of China again".

In 2022, he introduced the Chinese Communist Party Visa Ban Act, which would effectively prohibit any member of the CCP from visiting the United States. In March 2023, he voiced support for revoking China's permanent normal trade relations status.

In 2025, Rubio's State Department published a directive, which suggested to call the Chinese leader “General Secretary of the Chinese Communist Party”, instead of “President of China” reflecting the supremacy of the CCP over China.

==== Iran ====
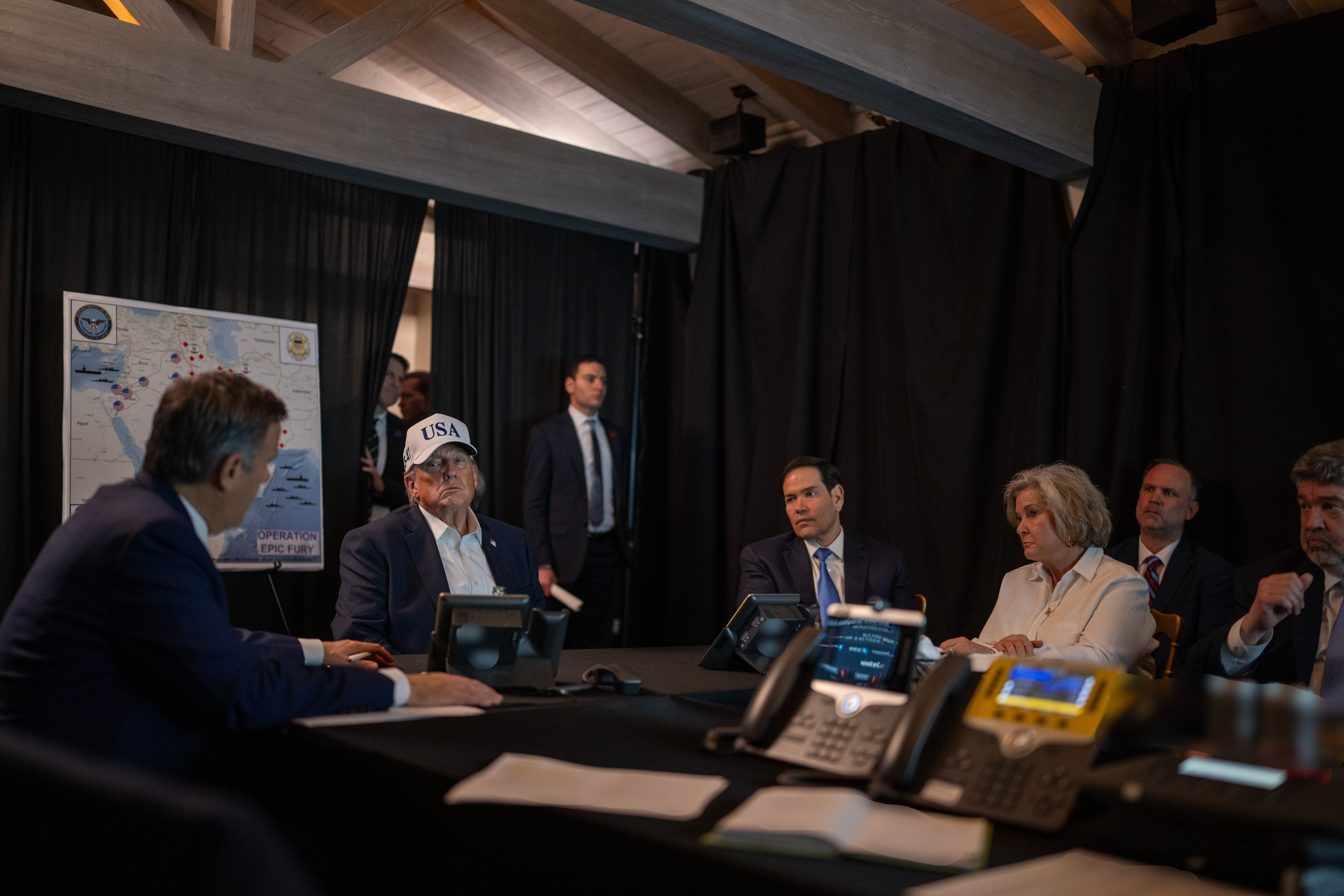
Rubio and President Trump during the 2026 Iran war

Rubio opposed the Iran deal.

In March 2017, Rubio was one of five senators to introduce legislation expanding sanctions targeting the ballistic missile development of Iran along with support for terrorism, any transfer of weapons, and human rights violations. Senate Foreign Relations Committee Chairman Bob Corker said the sanctions would enable the United States "to regain the initiative on Iran and push back forcefully against this threat to our security and that of our allies."

In July 2017, Rubio voted in favor of the Countering America's Adversaries Through Sanctions Act that placed sanctions on Iran together with Russia and North Korea.

In September 2018, Rubio wrote a letter to the Justice Department requesting an investigation into whether former Secretary of State John Kerry had violated federal laws in meeting with Iranian diplomats after leaving office to discuss the Iran nuclear deal, citing that Americans "deserve to know that U.S. laws are enforced regardless of any individual’s past position."

==== Iraq ====
In July 2014, Rubio supported Obama's initial response to the Islamic State of Iraq and the Levant's invasion of Iraq and called for aid to local Sunni forces.

==== Israel ====
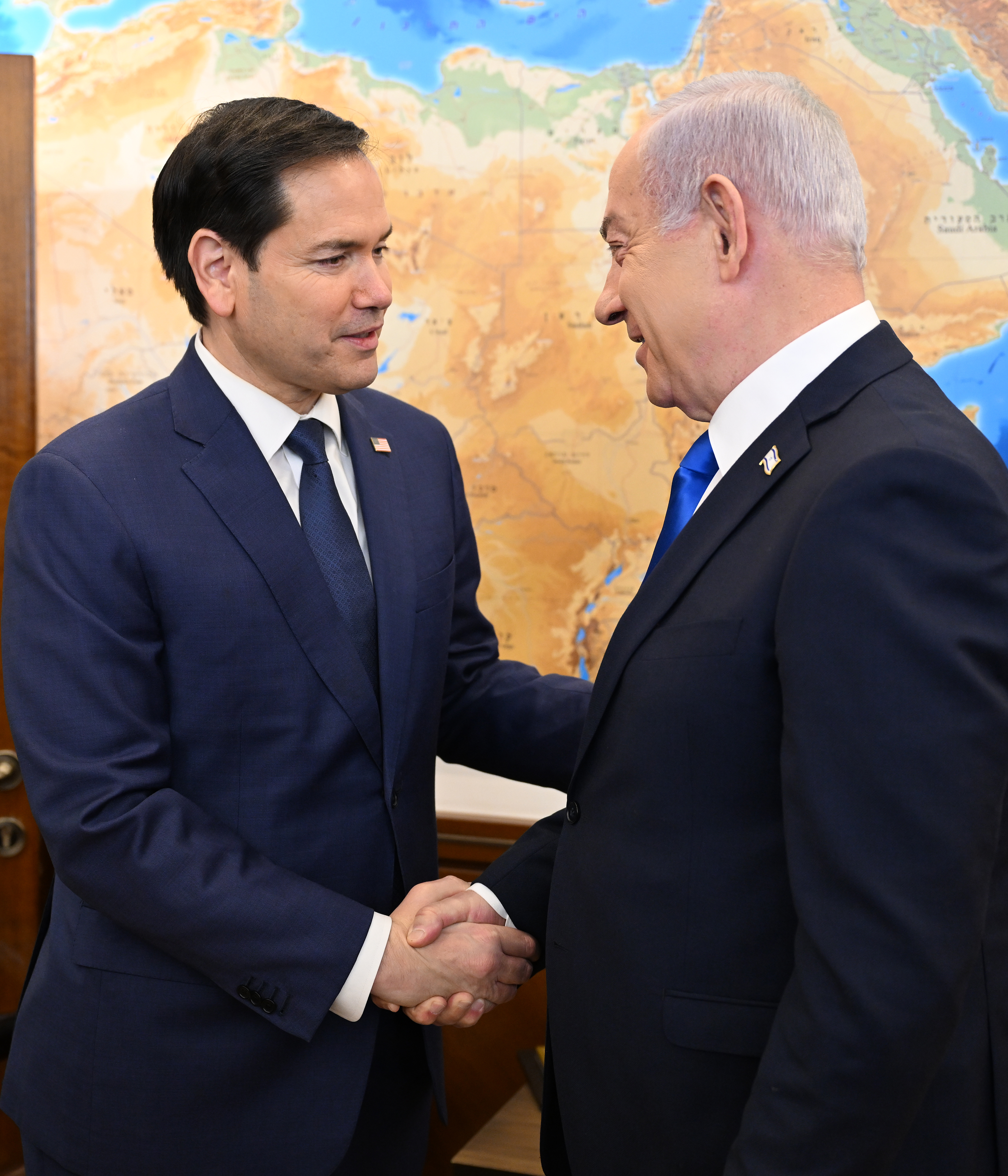
Rubio and Israeli prime minister Benjamin Netanyahu in 2025

Marco Rubio has been a strong advocate for Israel throughout his political career, consistently supporting policies favoring strong U.S.-Israel relations. In Senate speeches and public statements, he has emphasized the importance of this alliance, stating in November 2015: "If America doesn't stand with Israel, who would we stand with? If Israel — a democracy, a strong American ally on the international stage — if they are not worthy of our unconditional support, then what ally of ours around the world can feel safe in their alliance with us?"

===== Policy positions and legislative actions =====
In September 2016, Rubio co-sponsored a $1.5 billion emergency spending bill for Israel, equally divided between missile defense and direct military assistance. His colleague Lindsey Graham emphasized that the bill demonstrated America's commitment to "make clear to the Iranian regime that we continue to stand with our close ally and are committed to Israel's defense."

===== Jerusalem Recognition =====
Like other Republican candidates in the 2016 presidential election, Rubio pledged to move the U.S. embassy to Jerusalem if elected president. When President Trump officially recognized Jerusalem as Israel's capital in December 2017, Rubio supported the decision, stating: "I commend President Trump for following U.S. law and recognizing Jerusalem as the eternal capital of the Jewish state of Israel."

===== Israeli-Palestinian Conflict =====
Rubio has consistently opposed a two-state solution to the Israeli-Palestinian conflict since 2015. During the 2016 presidential campaign, Rubio criticized then-candidate Donald Trump's self-described "neutral" stance on the Israeli-Palestinian conflict, characterizing such neutrality as "an anti-Israel position.". He has criticized international efforts to pressure Israel on settlement issues, including opposing the 2016 UN Security Council Resolution 2334 that condemned Israeli settlements in the West Bank, describing it as "one-sided." In 2024, Rubio opposed a Palestinian-led UN General Assembly resolution calling for the implementation of an International Court of Justice decision which called for the end of Israeli settlements, and reparations for Palestinians.

===== 2023 Israel-Gaza War =====
Following Hamas's October 2023 attack on Israel, Rubio expressed strong support for Israel's right to self-defense. On October 9, 2023, he advocated for a "disproportionate" response in Israel's war with Hamas in the Gaza Strip. When addressing concerns about civilian casualties in Gaza on CNN, Rubio replied "I don’t think there’s any way Israel can be expected to coexist or find some diplomatic off-ramp with these savages.... They have to be exterminated"

==== Myanmar ====
Rubio condemned the genocide of the Rohingya Muslim minority in Myanmar and called for a stronger response to the crisis.

==== North Korea ====
In May 2017, Rubio, Jeff Flake, and Cory Gardner signed a letter to the U.N. Security Council urging the council "to take immediate and additional actions to increase the pressure on the DPRK and bring Pyongyang into full compliance with its international obligations.” The senators specified their support for "new sanctions that prohibit the DPRK’s access to hard currency, prohibit the imports of minerals from the DPRK, cut off the oil supply to the DPRK, and take additional actions to address the DPRK’s malicious cyber behavior."

In March 2018, Rubio was one of six Republican senators to sign a letter to President Trump asserting the US must verify before trusting the North Korean regime and requesting Trump "respond to Congress in a timely manner regarding the administration’s strategy to engage the DPRK and your plan for a robust implementation of the maximum pressure campaign against this heinous regime." In May, Rubio stated his belief that North Korean leader Kim Jong-un would "try to get as much sanctions relief as possible without having to give up his weapons" and his opposition to the US striking North Korea militarily if there was fear North Korea could strike the US at some point, though admitted the option could realistically be employed eventually.

==== Saudi Arabia ====
In June 2017, Rubio voted against a resolution by Rand Paul and Chris Murphy that would block President Trump's $510 million sale of precision-guided munitions to Saudi Arabia that made up a portion of the $110 billion arms sale Trump announced during his visit to Saudi Arabia the previous year.

In March 2018, Rubio voted to table a resolution spearheaded by Bernie Sanders, Chris Murphy, and Mike Lee that would have required President Trump to withdraw American troops either in or influencing Yemen within the next 30 days unless they were combating Al-Qaeda.

In March 2019 during a confirmation hearing for retired General John Abizaid, President Trump's nominee for U.S. Ambassador to Saudi Arabia, Rubio said that the Crown Prince of Saudi Arabia Mohammad bin Salman had gone "full gangster", was "reckless", "ruthless" and like "something out of a James Bond movie".

==== Syria ====
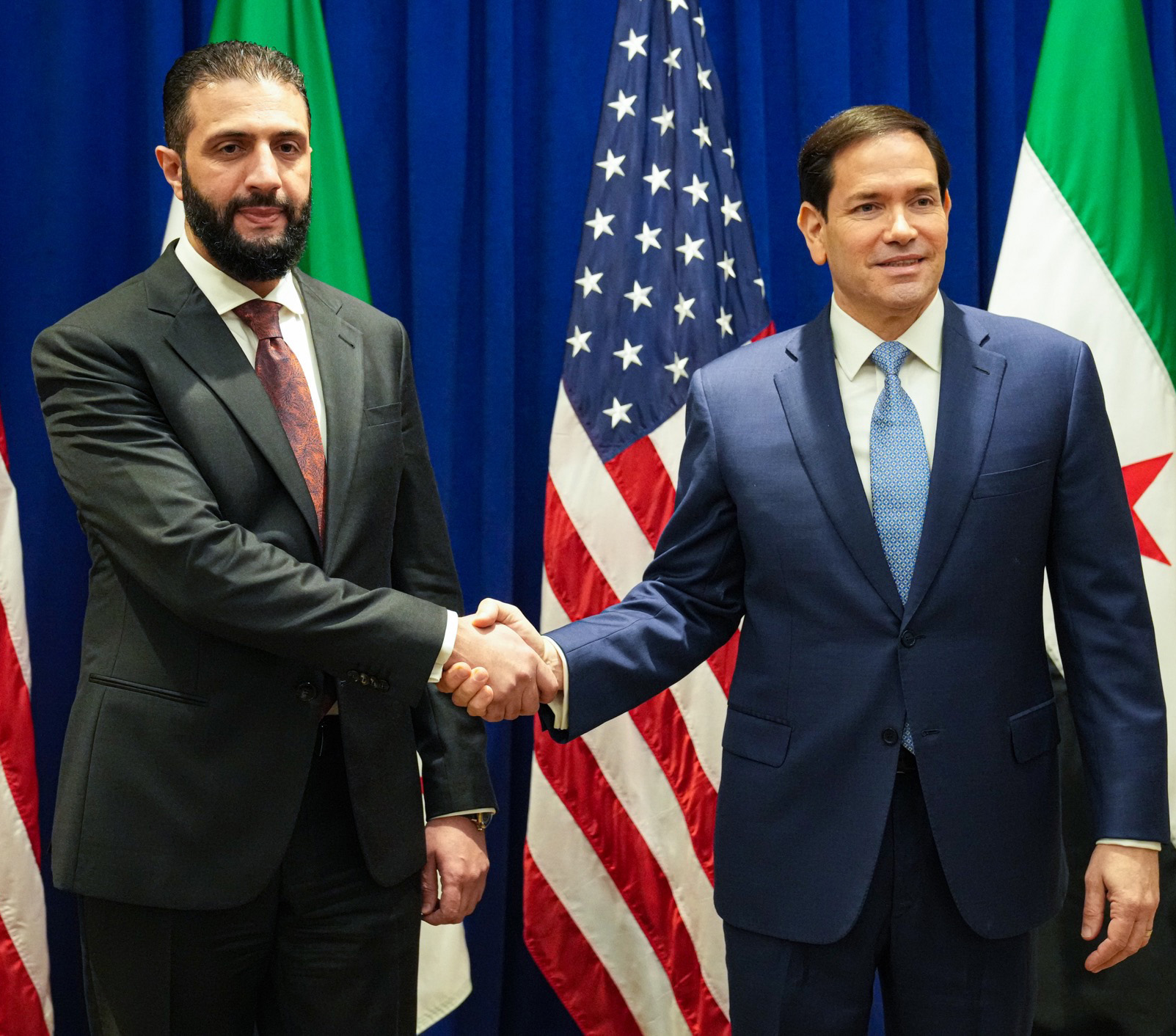
Rubio with Syrian president Ahmed al-Sharaa in New York City on September 23, 2025

In September 2013, Rubio voted against a resolution authorizing President Obama to use military force against Syria in response to the Assad regime's use of chemical weapons, stating that he was skeptical that the planned military strike would have the intended effect. In July 2014, Rubio called for arms to support moderate elements in the Syrian opposition and a bombing campaign to stop ISIL's advance, as well as no-fly zones in Syria to protect civilians from Bashar al-Assad.

In December 2018, after President Trump announced the withdrawal of American troops in Syria, Rubio was one of six senators to sign a letter expressing concern for the move and their belief "that such action at this time is a premature and costly mistake that not only threatens the safety and security of the United States, but also emboldens ISIS, Bashar al Assad, Iran, and Russia."

==== Taiwan (Republic of China) ====
Rubio in 2018 supported the Taiwan Travel Act passed by Congress to improve relations with the Republic of China (ROC, Taiwan), which aggravated the PRC.

Rubio, on May 3, 2022, introduced the Taiwan Peace Through Strength Act, which would require the U.S. Department of Defense (DoD) to conduct an annual review of U.S. war plans to defend Taiwan and to develop a list of specific capabilities that Taiwan is approved to acquire based on that assessment; fast-track Foreign Military Sales (FMS) to Taiwan by requiring the U.S. Department of State to preclear the capabilities identified in the aforementioned DoD annual review for expedited transfer to Taiwan, compel defense contractors to place Taiwan's FMS orders ahead of other countries in the production line regardless of the order in which the contracts were signed amend the Taiwan Relations Act to replace outdated language regarding “arms of a defensive character” with new language that sets an enhanced standard for arms sales to deter conflict with the PLA, establish a comprehensive joint training program aimed at improving Taiwan's defense capabilities and, ultimately, achieving interoperability, set up a high-level, joint military planning mechanism between the U.S. and Taiwan, ban U.S. defense contractors from doing business in China, and authorize $2 billion per year in Foreign Military Financing (FMF) for Taiwan.

Rubio celebrated the 111th Anniversary of the founding of the Republic of China, saying "Taiwan’s robust economy and steadfast commitment to democracy is admirable. It is a valued ally of the United States and plays a critical role in preserving peace, promoting democracy, and providing stability in the Indo-Pacific."

==== Turkey ====
Rubio condemned Turkey's wide-ranging crackdown on dissent following a failed July 2016 coup. Rubio said: "When you have a regime that’s willing to arrest people or make up charges in order to create leverage, as they did with pastor Brunson, of course I’m concerned."

=== Europe ===
==== NATO ====
In 2015, Rubio said he would risk a war with Russia to defend America's NATO ally Turkey.

In January 2019, Rubio was one of eight senators to reintroduce legislation to prevent President Trump from withdrawing the United States from NATO by imposing a requirement of a two-thirds approval from the Senate for a president to suspend, terminate or withdraw American involvement with the international organization following a report that President Trump expressed interest in withdrawing from NATO several times during the previous year. Rubio stated that NATO was "more important than ever with Russia’s growing subversive activities in the region and beyond" and it was critical to American national security as well as that of its European allies "that the United States remain engaged and play an active role in NATO."

In 2023, Rubio and Tim Kaine co-sponsored a provision in the annual National Defense Authorization Act that codified that a U.S. president cannot withdraw from NATO without congressional approval.

==== Russia ====
On 25 March 2014 during a Senate speech Rubio defended US assurances offered in Budapest Memorandum to Ukraine in exchange for its submission of nuclear weapons, calling for their decisive fulfillment following Russia's annexation of Crimea. He also argued that abandoning Ukraine now will have a negative impact on global non-proliferation efforts.

During the 2016 Republican Party presidential primaries, Rubio referred to Russian president Vladimir Putin as a "gangster" and "an organized crime figure who runs a country".

In August 2018, Rubio told reporters, "Every entity in America involved in politics at a high level at this point should expect that they are a target of an influence campaign by Russia, potentially by China", reasoning that this was "a very low-cost way to inflict damage on your opponent … they can all afford to have high-level electronic intrusions that allow them to disseminate false information, drive narratives and cause chaos among us."

In November 2018, Rubio, along with Roger Wicker, Jeanne Shaheen, and Chris Coons, released a statement opposing the candidacy of Russian Major General Alexander Prokopchuk to lead Interpol, writing that they had "no doubt that Mr. Prokopchuk will further institutionalize the abuse of Interpol red notices and block ongoing efforts at meaningful reform" if elected president. Russia responded to the statement comparing it to "a kind of election interference, the election held by this international organization."

In November 2018, Rubio was one of 25 Republican senators to sign a letter led by Jon Kyl to President Trump expressing the view that the New START nuclear treaty's value "depends on a sustained and vigorous U.S. nuclear weapons modernization program, strict compliance by Russia with its arms control obligations, and a true balance of nuclear capabilities between the parties to the Treaty" and charging Russia with being "in material breach of its arms control commitments" such as the Intermediate-Range Nuclear Forces Treaty through its deployment of ground-launched cruise missiles.

In January 2019, Rubio was one of 11 Republican senators to vote to advance legislation intended to block President Trump's intent to lift sanctions against three Russian companies.

On 20 December 2025 on a press conference Rubio used a phrase "it's not our war" when talking about the Russo-Ukrainian war which had been picked by media and confronted with his 25 March 2014 position (see above), while Rubio said "we have equities, we have engagement in this war, but it’s not our war per se" and he continued to elaborate why US engagement is critical for ending the war.

==== Hungary ====
In 2019, Rubio signed a letter expressing concerns about Hungary’s close relationship with Moscow.

=== North America ===
==== Patriot Act and Guantanamo Bay ====
In 2010, he stated that radical Islamist terrorists pose the greatest threat to the United States, and that these radicals intend to impose their beliefs on the world. He voted "yes" on extending the roving wiretaps provision of the Patriot Act, which governs surveillance of suspected terrorists. Rubio favors collection of bulk metadata for purposes of national security.

Rubio favors the detention of terrorists at Guantanamo Bay so that they can be interrogated for intelligence purposes, and has stated that if necessary he would re-open the military prison there.

==== Cuba ====
Rubio opposed the Cuban thaw of the Obama administration.

=== South America ===
==== Venezuela ====
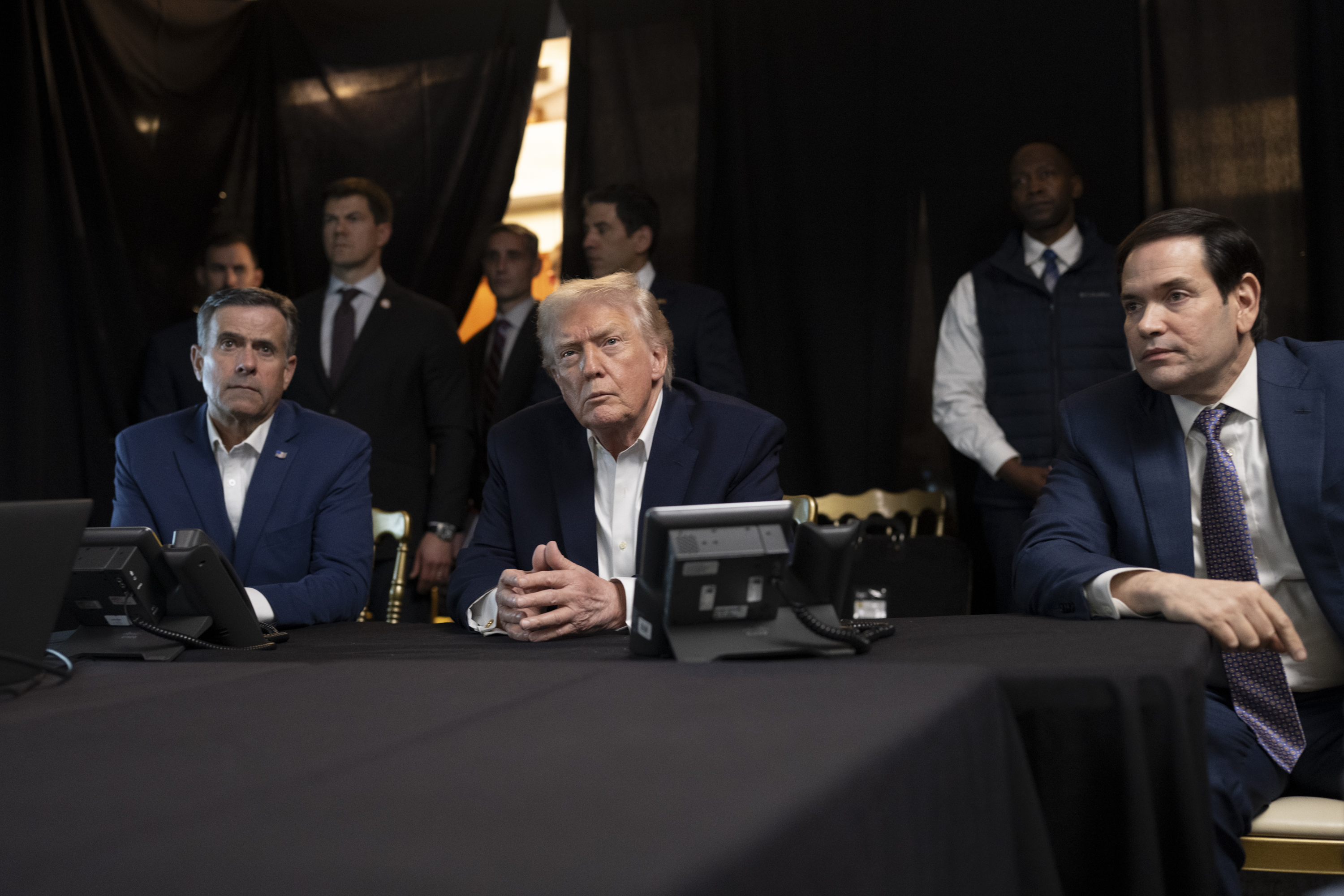
Rubio during the 2026 United States intervention in Venezuela

In February 2019, Rubio tweeted the bloody body of Libyan dictator Muammar Gaddafi in an apparent threat to Nicolas Maduro.

In March 2019, Rubio was one of four senators to sign a letter to President Trump requesting he grant temporary protected status (TPS) to Venezuelan citizens in the US "in light of the ongoing violence, deteriorating security situation, and humanitarian crisis in Venezuela caused by the illegitimate regime of Maduro."

In 2026, CNN called Rubio the "driving force of the strategy" of the 2026 United States strikes in Venezuela operation.

== Social issues ==
Rubio joined 22 other Republican senators in voting against reauthorizing the Violence Against Women Act, stating that he largely supported it, but objected to certain new provisions added to the law by the reauthorization bill. His political opponents were pleased that Rubio cast a vote that could hurt him in 2016, though Rubio voiced support for the overall law.

Rubio opposes legal abortion, even in cases of rape and incest. Rubio has said: "I believe all human life, irrespective of the circumstance in which it came into being, is worthy of protection." Rubio strongly opposes the U.S. Supreme Court's landmark abortion rights decision in Roe v. Wade (1973), calling it a "historically, egregiously flawed decision" and "one of America's most blatant instances of judicial activism." He praised the Dobbs v. Jackson Women's Health Organization (2022) decision that overturned Roe v. Wade.

On capital punishment, Rubio opposes protracted legal battles that he argues delay justice for the victims, so he favors streamlining the appeals process.

On LGBT issues, Rubio believes states should govern the issue, not the national government. On March 14, 2013, he spoke at the Conservative Political Action Conference and said "states should have the right to define marriage in the traditional way". Although he does not believe the issues should be legislated at a national level, according to PBS NewsHour, Rubio believes (as PBS puts it) that "marriage is between a man and a woman", and he disagrees with the Supreme Court decision in 2015 legalizing same-sex marriage in all fifty states. In July 2022, Rubio stated that a vote on a bill to codify marriage equality would be "a stupid waste of time."

Rubio opposed the nomination of Sonia Sotomayor to the Supreme Court based on "her case history and testimony regarding the Second Amendment at the state level, eminent domain takings and the so-called constitutional right to privacy that resulted in the Roe v. Wade decision."

In February 2019, Rubio introduced the Freedom to Compete Act, legislation amending a 1938 labor act preventing employers from using non-compete agreements in contracts for certain non-exempt employees. In a statement, Rubio said, "Depending on the state, people would be shocked at how many blue collar jobs where people are basically forced to sign this non-compete agreement and the minute they decide they're going to move to another job because it's closer to home, better benefits, or better pay they're told they can't or they'll get sued."

In February 2019, Rubio was one of 11 senators to sign a letter to Energy Secretary Rick Perry and Homeland Security Secretary Kirstjen Nielsen urging them "to work with all federal, state and local regulators, as well as the hundreds of independent power producers and electricity distributors nation-wide to ensure our systems are protected" and affirming that they were "ready and willing to provide any assistance you need to secure our critical electricity infrastructure."

In March 2019, Rubio was one of eight senators to introduce a 13.6 billion relief package to help those in states affected by natural disasters including an additional 600 million in nutrition assistance for Puerto Rico in response to the disaster declaration issued by President Trump.

In March 2019, Rubio spearheaded a resolution that would impose a constitutional amendment limiting the Supreme Court to nine justices. In a statement, Rubio opined that a proposal by Democrats to pack the court "represents the latest shortsighted effort to undermine America's confidence in our institutions and our democracy."

== Taxes, spending, and trade ==
Rubio supports balancing the federal budget, while prioritizing defense spending. He supports a balanced budget amendment as well as statutory caps on federal spending, and opposed President Obama's stimulus package of 2009.

Rubio supports Social Security changes to prevent projected future deficits in the program. He believes the program should have a higher age for the start of benefits for workers who are more than 10 years away from retirement to account for Americans living longer. He has stated his support of federal R&D funding, industrial policy, and space exploration funding to promote technological innovation, which he sees as critical to the development to the economy.

The National Taxpayers Union, a conservative taxpayers advocacy organization, gave Rubio grades of 'A' in 2011, and 'B+' in 2012 and 2013.

In 2014, Rubio proposed legislation to replace the earned income tax credit with a federal wage enhancement for qualifying low-wage jobs. The proposal would apply to singles as well as married couples and families with children. It would also arrive in sync with a monthly paycheck rather than a year-end lump-sum credit. Rubio asserted that this was a "better way to support low-income workers than simply raising the minimum wage." Rubio has also proposed a 25% tax credit for businesses that offer their employees at least four weeks of paid family leave. The tax break would be capped at 12 weeks, and at $4,000 per employee.

In March 2015, Rubio, along with Republican Senator Mike Lee, submitted a tax reform proposal which called for a simplified tax code with just two tax rates: 15% for individuals earning less than $75,000 annually and 35% for those earning more than that. It would eliminate capital gains taxes and add a new $2,500 per child tax credit for families. The corporate tax rate would be reduced to 25%, and businesses would be able to fully deduct the cost of investments in the year made. An analysis by the Tax Foundation found that Rubio's plan would result in a loss of government revenue of $2.4 trillion (using dynamic models which take into account the projected economic growth from tax cuts) to $6 trillion (using more traditional static models). The Tax Foundation says that under Rubio's plan, these revenue shortfalls would substantially increase the national debt, which would not return to its current level until 2040. Rubio's campaign has said that he will offset the lost revenue through spending reductions, such as by increasing the eligibility age for Social Security and by reducing Medicare spending. Using static assumptions and dynamic scoring, the proposed tax cuts would increase the after-tax income of the top 1% of earners by 12-28%, the top 10% by 6-20%, the middle 10% by 2-16%, and the bottom 10% by 44-56%. Rubio later updated his proposal to add a 25% tax bracket, so that the individual tax rate would be 15% for those earning less than $75,000 annually, 25% for those earning between $75,000 and $150,000 annually, and 35% for those earning more than that.

Jared Bernstein, senior fellow at the Center on Budget and Policy Priorities, criticized Rubio's proposals, writing that Rubio's plan "takes the cake" in making the tax code more regressive and would "hemorrhage revenues while bequeathing a massive gift of wealth to the top 0.0003 percent." In contrast, David M. McIntosh of the Club for Growth praised Rubio's tax plan, calling it a "pro-growth tax cut and reform plan that would fundamentally reform the tax code and the entitlement state," as well as lauding Rubio's support for free trade, tort reform, and reduced regulations.

In February 2019, during ongoing disputes between the United States and China on trade, Rubio was one of 10 senators to sign a bipartisan letter to Homeland Security Secretary Kirstjen Nielsen and Energy Secretary Rick Perry asserting that the American government "should consider a ban on the use of Huawei inverters in the United States and work with state and local regulators to raise awareness and mitigate potential threats" and urged them "to work with all federal, state and local regulators, as well as the hundreds of independent power producers and electricity distributors nation-wide to ensure our systems are protected."

In March 2019, Rubio and Bob Menendez introduced a bill granting Puerto Rican taxpayers equal access to the child tax credit (CTC) used by parents in other parts of the United States through an amendment to the federal tax code.

In May 2019, Rubio was a cosponsor of the Transporting Livestock Across America Safely Act, a bipartisan bill introduced by Ben Sasse and Jon Tester intended to reform hours of service for livestock haulers through authorizing drivers to have the flexibility to rest at any point during their trip without it being counted against their hours of service and exempting loading and unloading times from the hours of service calculation of driving time.

In May 2019, Rubio was one of eight senators to cosponsor the Global Leadership in Advanced Manufacturing Act, a bill that would develop new institutes that supported American manufacturing in technology and grant more federal investment in the national network such as preexisting institutes being made to compete globally as well as continue American economic and national security.

Regarding trade, Rubio is supportive of the Trans Pacific Partnership, and say that the U.S. risks being excluded from global trade if it is not more open to it. However, in June 2018, he called for a new nationalism as opposed to an "economic elitism that has replaced a commitment to the dignity of work with a blind faith in financial markets and that views America simply as an economy instead of a nation", and has since expressed support for President Donald Trump's trade war against China.

In June 2019, along with Bob Menendez, Tom Cotton, and Kirsten Gillibrand, Rubio introduced the EQUITABLE Act, legislation that would increase oversight of Chinese and other foreign companies that were listed on American exchanges along with delisting noncompliant firms for a duration of three years.

In July 2019, Rubio was one of eight senators to introduce the Agricultural Trucking Relief Act, a bill that would alter the definition of an agricultural commodity to include both horticultural and aquacultural products and promote a larger consistency in regulation through both federal and state agencies as part of an attempt to ease regulatory burdens on trucking and the agri-community.

In July 2019, Rubio was a cosponsor of the Defending America's 5G Future Act, a bill that would prevent Huawei from being removed from the "entity list" of the Commerce Department without an act of Congress and authorize Congress to block administration waivers for U.S. companies to do business with Huawei. The bill would also codify President Trump's executive order from the previous May that empowered his administration to block foreign tech companies deemed a national security threat from conducting business in the United States.

Rubio was among the 31 Republicans who voted against final passage of the Fiscal Responsibility Act of 2023 in the Senate.
