= Emphasis of matter =

Emphasis of matter is a type of paragraph in an auditors' report on financial statements. Such a paragraph is added to indicate a matter which is disclosed appropriately in the notes forming part of the financial statements that the auditor considers is fundamental to the users' understanding of the financial statements.

An emphasis of matter paragraph indicates that the auditor's opinion is not modified with respect to the matter emphasized.

Under the framework of the International Standards on Auditing (ISA), the emphasis of matter paragraph is placed after the opinion paragraph (and, consequently, towards the end of the report), in the auditor's report.

== Distinction from a modified opinion ==
An emphasis-of-matter paragraph does not modify the auditor’s opinion. International Standard on Auditing 706 states that such a paragraph is used to draw users’ attention to a matter already appropriately presented or disclosed in the financial statements which, in the auditor’s judgment, is of such importance that it is fundamental to users’ understanding of the financial statements.

By contrast, a modified opinion is required when the auditor concludes that the financial statements are materially misstated, or when the auditor is unable to obtain sufficient appropriate audit evidence. In those circumstances, the auditor expresses a qualified opinion, an adverse opinion, or a disclaimer of opinion rather than merely including an emphasis-of-matter paragraph.
