= Early 21st-century Chinese reverse mergers =

Aspect of Chinese economic history

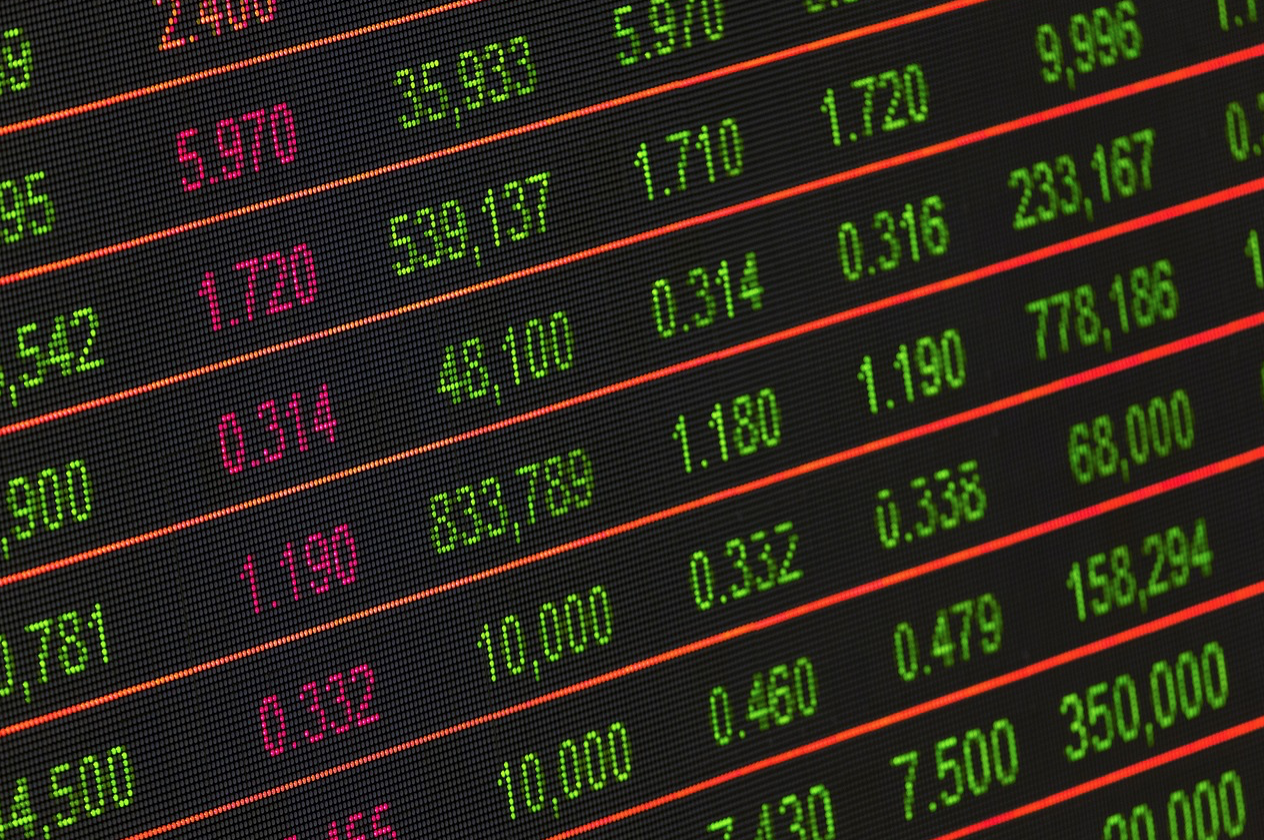
Stock market board and daily stock price changes

Chinese reverse mergers within the United States are accountable for 85% of all foreign reverse mergers in the early 21st century. A reverse merger, also known as a reverse takeover, is where a private company acquires a publicly traded firm or "shell company" that has essentially zero value on a registered stock exchange.

The shell company's securities since becoming dormant are not registered under the Securities Exchange Act of 1934, where transactions on the secondary market are monitored. Reverse mergers in US markets and other countries had occurred in the past, but a large wave of Chinese companies came to the scene in the early 2000s.

At the beginning of the 21st century, China was still known as a developing country with about 1.26 billion citizens. With the staggering population and a large majority of state-owned enterprises becoming privatized by the early 2000s, China was poised for substantial economic reform and growth.

For Chinese companies to expand and to be able to secure further financial capital investment, companies were seeking IPOs on the Shenzhen or Shanghai markets. In seeking these Chinese market IPOs, the long and much more stringent Chinese process could potentially take up to two and a half years at the rate of 10 companies a month being listed.

== Reasoning ==
=== Access to funding ===
For private Chinese firms looking to expand and obtain capital investment, they could only raise private forms of equity through private investors, venture capitalists, etc. A company with public status on a United States exchange would give them the ability to access much larger pools of public investments and an entry into the United States capital markets. Being listed on a United States exchange would also enhance companies' credibility, making it appear to investors that the companies are in compliance with the United States' corporate governance standards.

=== Ease of obtaining public status ===
The process of obtaining public status through a reverse merger is much faster than that of an IPO, usually taking roughly 6 months instead of years. The sped-up process also helps the company cut many costs and avoids underwriting fees of an investment bank that is involved with an IPO procedure. Because the Chinese Government does not allow the SEC to oversee these businesses, they can progress relatively unimpeded.

== During the Great Recession ==
=== China's economic boom ===
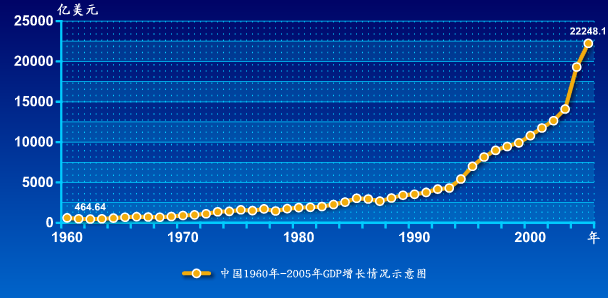
Steep growth in the early 21st century for China as measured in Gross Domestic Product (GDP)

After the financial crisis spread from the United States to China, China was one of the first to implement an economic stimulus plan to attract further investment through large amounts of government spending which was called seed funding. The plan was focused toward large manufacturing and civil infrastructure projects all with the ultimate goal of recovery growth when in presence of slowing exports. China approved subsidies and increased credit that stimulated private investment, showing the country was ready to rely less on government participation to encourage growth.

=== Investment abroad ===
With the burst of Chinese Reverse Mergers, it was measured in 2012 that there was greater than 300 U.S. listed Chinese companies trading on U.S. exchanges. With sales and earnings still growing while the majority of other places in the world were slowing, investors saw opportunity in these easy-to-purchase stocks. With the growth coming in China from the economic stimulus package, lucrative startups originating in mainland China were hard to invest in due to the restriction to foreigners being able to invest in China A-shares and the complicated process to obtain them through the Qualified Foreign Institutional Investor system. Being listed on established U.S. stock exchanges made for an easy opportunity for abroad investors to purchase stock in prospective companies in which they saw growth in the emerging market sector.

== Regulation, fraud, and stock price volatility ==
=== Regulation and secrecy laws ===
Seal of the U.S. Securities and Exchange Commission

The overwhelming main cause of why such a large influx of Chinese companies were easily able to enter the United States markets through these reverse mergers is that U.S. regulators are not able to investigate and monitor these companies under China's federal authority.

As for China, these companies registered on the US exchanges and not on the Chinese exchanges gives little incentive for Chinese regulators to oversee these firms’ actions due to the exchange location. For these companies, their audits are a source of controversy between the United States and Chinese governments. A US-based accounting firm cannot officially open an office in China, so they run the business through a foreign affiliate under the cover of a multinational enterprise.

An example of the complex system of the foreign affiliates is the case of US-based accounting firm Deloitte Touche when they were asked to exhibit the audits from the Shanghai affiliate by the U.S. Securities and Exchange Commission (SEC). Deloitte was bounded by Chinese secrecy laws in exhibiting the audits and elected to not. The Chinese Securities Regulatory Commission and Public Accounting Oversight Board are working on an agreement for greater oversight of these Chinese reverse merger companies. Even with the discussions of an agreement, the SEC is tightening the prerequisites needed for a company to pursue public status through a reverse merger.

=== Fraud ===
As the Chinese companies gained access to the US markets through these reverse mergers, the majority of them were looking to make a quick profit. To make the companies look more attractive for potential investors, companies largely overstated revenue figures, inflated assets holdings, stated customers and employees that did not exist, and exercised other faulty business practices in relation to corporate governance that would easily misled investors.

The practice of fraud in these companies was a system feeding from top management and moving throughout the companies, with the understanding that the goal was to deceive and make a large profit. In recent studies on the effects of Chinese reverse mergers, Charles Lee and colleagues suggested that, in their research, the accounting fraud of these Chinese reverse merger (CRM) companies was so in depth that they could not expose the fraud when looking at data of three years since the initial public listing date. Further research displays that over 150 Chinese reverse merger companies on U.S. stock exchanges have exercised unethical/fraudulent business and accounting practices.

=== Stock price volatility ===
For investors who have been exposed to the negative news and accusations that surrounded the CRM companies, their mistrust was a cause for large losses and price volatility of these stocks. Chinese reverse merger companies as of 2011 have seen a nearly 50% decrease in stock price. One study in the China Journal of Accounting Research showed for the CRM companies in which fraud was potentially evident, their stock prices post accusations were extremely poor and none of the companies could recover to price levels seen prior to the accusations. 63.7% had continuing falling prices and only four observed firms even made it to greater than 70% of the former stock price. A proper example of stock price volatility for these companies can be found with China Green Agriculture (CGA), where after a report by J Capital Research accusing the company of fraud due to the manipulation to the real value of the company, CGA's stock price plummeted 10% on the day of the report and fell from a starting of $9.05 to $4.45.

== Whistleblowing and short-sellers ==
As the problems in these CRM companies began to appear, a number of whistleblowers and accusers were prominent, mainly investment institutions, research groups, and individual analysts. Ten investment institutions came forward, including Absaroka Capital Management, GeoInvesting, and Kerrisdale Capital. Research groups collectively accounted for 35 accusations, including Glaucus Research Group, International Financial Research & Association, Muddy Waters Research, Variant View Research, Citron Research, and Lucas McGee Research. Ten accusations came from individual analysts. From 2010 to 2011, it was noted that 62 CRM's were accused of fraud by these eventual short sellers.

=== Short-selling ===
With the intent of exposing faulty financial reporting on the CRM companies' behalf, whistleblowers began to aggressively short them. Their main purpose in researching these companies was to investigate into the suspiciously high growth in both accounts receivable, revenue, and profits. This was especially prevalent when comparing these numbers to industry competitors of the period and past financial history of the company. The lack of strong internal control by upper management, less than standard audit reports, and low levels of managerial shareholdings of these CRMs made them a target for short sellers looking to do financial investigative research.

== Legal and financial repercussions ==
The short selling and fraud allegations of 62 CRM companies from 2010 to 2011 lead to a nearly 50% decrease in equity values of CRMs as a whole. A look into the 12-month performance index by Bloomberg reveals that about 80 CRM stock prices peaked in November 2010 at around 200, then sharply declined to under 100 by the end of the year.

During this intense period of fraud allegations by short sellers, the SEC legally de-listed or halted the trading of more than 20 CRM companies in 2011. The consistent negative publicity surrounding the accused CRM companies had an also adverse effect on the stock prices of both accredited CRM firms and Chinese IPOs. Resulting from the halted trading and delisting of the various CRM firms from 2010 to 2011, all US-listed Chinese companies (both IPOs and CRMs) lost roughly 72% in market capitalization. As for the legal repercussions surrounding CRM companies, the SEC wrote a notice highlighting the potential dangers to investors accompanied with investing in CRMs. The notice also explained the reasons for de-listing or halting trading of firms that at the time had been recently investigated. The study in the China Journal of Accounting Research furthered showed that of 37 lawsuits initiated by law firms, there were only 7 settled cases resulting in a verdict and 20 unsolved cases without final verdicts.
