= Holding Foreign Companies Accountable Act =

United States federal law

- Long title: An Act to amend the Sarbanes-Oxley Act of 2002 to require certain issuers to disclose to the Securities and Exchange Commission information regarding foreign jurisdictions that prevent the Public Company Accounting Oversight Board from performing inspections under that Act, and for other purposes.
- Enacted by: the 116th United States Congress

Citations
- Public law: Pub. L. 116–222 (text) (PDF)

Legislative history
- Introduced in the Senate as S. 945 by John Kennedy (R-LA) on March 28, 2019; Committee consideration by United States Senate Committee on Banking, Housing, and Urban Affairs; Passed the Senate on May 20, 2020 (Unanimous consent); Passed the House on December 2, 2020 (Unanimous voice vote); Signed into law by President Donald Trump on December 18, 2020

The Holding Foreign Companies Accountable Act is a 2020 law that requires companies publicly listed on stock exchanges in the United States to disclose to the United States Securities and Exchange Commission information on foreign jurisdictions that prevent the Public Company Accounting Oversight Board (PCAOB) from conducting inspections. Under the law, such companies will be banned from trading and delisted from exchanges if the PCAOB is not able to audit specified reports for three consecutive years. The bill requires such companies to declare they are not owned or controlled by the Chinese government.

== Background ==
In 2019, a similar bill titled the EQUITABLE Act was introduced by Senator Marco Rubio (R-FL) in the United States Senate over concerns certain foreign companies were non-compliant with oversight and audit rules on American stock exchanges. This was in response to the lack of compliance and transparency among Chinese companies listed on US exchanges, thereby increasing the risk of defrauding investors.

The consideration of the Holding Foreign Companies Accountable Act in Congress coincided with the high-profile financial scandal involving Chinese coffee chain Luckin Coffee, which fired both its CEO and COO in May 2020 for accounting fraud concerning the intentional fabrication of around $310 million in sales in 2019. This subsequently resulted in Luckin's shares plunging by around 80%. Luckin also received a delisting notice from the Nasdaq stock exchange on May 19, 2020. On June 26, it was confirmed that Luckin would be delisted from the Nasdaq and Luckin's stock saw its last day of trading.

== Legislative history ==
On May 20, 2020, the bill passed the United States Senate by unanimous consent. On December 2, 2020, the bill passed the United States House of Representatives by unanimous voice vote. The bill was signed into law by President Donald Trump on December 18, 2020.

== Implications ==
As required by the bill, the SEC started publishing in March 2022 a provisional list of foreign issuers that the PCAOB is unable to audit. Days later on 2 April, China Securities Regulatory Commission announced a proposed removal to a requirement that on-site inspections of Chinese companies with foreign listings can only be conducted by Chinese regulatory agencies.
