= Scope limitation =

A scope limitation is a restriction on the applicability of an auditor's report that may arise from the inability to obtain sufficient appropriate evidence about a component in the financial statements. When all the audit procedures that are considered necessary, either by circumstances, engagement, or client limitation, the audit is limited in scope.

Auditing standards suggest that when restrictions imposed by the client significantly limit the scope of the engagement the auditor should consider disclaiming the opinion.

Some scope limitations arise for reasons that are beyond the control of the client, such as fire and flood. Alternative procedures can overcome the risk of the auditor's qualified or disclaimer opinion. Simple procedures to provide sufficient evidence would be necessary for the auditor to adhere to US GAAP.

== Examples of limitations ==
- End of period inventory count limited, because the auditor is not engaged until after the end of the period.
- client's restriction on contact with customers to confirm the existence of accounts receivable.
- Disappearance of relevant evidentiary matter

The scope limitation should be described before the opinion or disclaimer paragraph.
