= Auditor's report =

Type of written document

An auditor's report is a formal opinion, or disclaimer thereof, issued by either an internal auditor or an independent external auditor as a result of an internal or external audit, as an assurance service in order for the user to make decisions based on the results of the audit.

Auditor's reports are considered essential tools when reporting financial information to users, particularly in business. Many third-party users prefer, or even require financial information to be certified by an independent external auditor. Audit reports derive value from increasing the credibility of financial statements, which subsequently increases investors' reliance on them. In the government, legislative and anti-corruption entities use audit reports to keep track of the actions of public administrators on behalf of citizens. Therefore auditing reports are a check mechanism on behalf of the citizen, to ensure that public finances, resources and trust are managed in entities created to foster good governance, such as local authorities, government departments, ministries and related government bodies.

== Auditor's report on financial statements ==
Auditor reports on financial statements are neither evaluations nor any other similar determination used to evaluate entities in order to make a decision. The report is only an opinion on whether the information presented is correct and free from material misstatements, whereas all other determinations are left for the user to decide.

There are four common types of auditor's reports, each one presenting a different situation encountered during the auditor's work. The four reports are as follows:

=== Unqualified Opinion ===
An opinion is said to be unqualified when he or she does not have any significant reservation in respect of matters contained in the Financial Statements. The most frequent type of report is referred to as the "Unqualified Opinion", and is regarded by many as the equivalent of a "clean bill of health" to a patient, which has led many to call it the "Clean Opinion", but in reality it is not a clean bill of health, because the Auditor can only provide reasonable assurance regarding the Financial Statements, not the health of the company itself, or the integrity of company records not part of the foundation of the Financial Statements. This type of report is issued by an auditor when the financial statements are free of material misstatements and are presented fairly in accordance with the Generally Accepted Accounting Principles (GAAP), which in other words means that the company's financial condition, position, and operations are fairly presented in the financial statements. It is the best type of report an auditee may receive from an external auditor.

An Unqualified Opinion indicates the following –

(1) The Financial Statements have been prepared using the Generally Accepted Accounting Principles which have been consistently applied;

(2) The Financial Statements comply with relevant statutory requirements and regulations;

(3) There is adequate disclosure of all material matters relevant to the proper presentation of the financial information subject to statutory requirements, where applicable;

(4) Any changes in the accounting principles or in the method of their application and the effects there of have been properly determined and disclosed in the Financial Statements.

The report consists of a title and header, a main body, the auditor's signature and address, and the report's issuance date. US auditing standards require that the title includes "independent" to convey to the user that the report was unbiased in all respects. Traditionally, the main body of the unqualified report consists of three main paragraphs, each with distinct standard wording and individual purpose. Nonetheless, certain auditors (including PricewaterhouseCoopers) have since modified the arrangement of the main body (but not the wording) in order to differentiate themselves from other audit firms, even though such modification is contrary to the clarified US AICPA standards on auditing.

The first paragraph (commonly referred to as the introductory paragraph) states the audit work performed and identifies the responsibilities of the auditor and the auditee in relation to the financial statements. The second paragraph (commonly referred to as the scope paragraph) details the scope of audit work, provides a general description of the nature of the work, examples of procedures performed, and any limitations the audit faced based on the nature of the work. This paragraph also states that the audit was performed in accordance with the country's prevailing generally accepted auditing standards and regulations. The third paragraph (commonly referred to as the opinion paragraph) simply states the auditor's opinion on the financial statements and whether they are in accordance with generally accepted accounting principles.

The following is an example of a standard unqualified auditor's report on financial statements as it is used in most countries, using the name ABC Company as an auditee's name. Note that this report is acceptable only for periods ending before December 15, 2012:

INDEPENDENT AUDITOR'S REPORT

Board of Directors, Stockholders, Owners, and/or Management of
ABC Company, Inc.
123 Main St.
Anytown, Any Country

We have audited the accompanying balance sheet of ABC Company, Inc. (the "Company") as of December 31, 20XX and the related statements of income, retained earnings, and cash flows for the year then ended. These financial statements are the responsibility of the Company's management. Our responsibility is to express an opinion on these financial statements based on our audit.

We conducted our audit in accordance with auditing standards generally accepted in (the country where the report is issued). Those standards require that we plan and perform the audit to obtain reasonable assurance about whether the financial statements are free of material misstatement. An audit includes examining, on a test basis, evidence supporting the amounts and disclosures in the financial statements. An audit also includes assessing the accounting principles used and significant estimates made by management, as well as evaluating the overall financial statement presentation. We believe that our audit provides a reasonable basis for our opinion.

In our opinion, the financial statements referred to above present fairly, in all material respects, the financial position of the Company as of December 31, 20XX, and the results of its operations and its cash flows for the year then ended in accordance with generally accepted accounting principles in (the country where the report is issued).

AUDITOR'S SIGNATURE
Auditor's name and address

Date = Last day of any significant field work
This date should not be dated earlier than when the auditor has sufficient audit evidence to support the opinion.

Recently modifications have been made by the PCAOB to the opinion in the independent auditors report. These changes can be attributed to the introduction of SAS No. 122 and SAS No. 123. For periods ending after December 15, 2012, the following is an example of a standard unqualified auditor's report on financial statements as it is used in most countries, using the name ABC Company, which was incorporated in California, as an auditee's name:

INDEPENDENT AUDITOR'S REPORT

Board of Directors, Stockholders, Owners, and/or Management of
ABC Company, Inc.
123 Main St.
Anytown, Any Country

We have audited the accompanying financial statements of ABC Company, Inc. (a California corporation), which comprise the balance sheet as of December 31, 20XX, and the related statements of income, retained earnings, and cash flows for the year then ended, and the related notes to the financial statements.

Management's Responsibility for the Financial Statements

Management is responsible for the preparation and fair presentation of these consolidated financial statements in accordance with U.S. generally accepted accounting principles; this includes the design, implementation, and maintenance of internal control relevant to the preparation and fair presentation of consolidated financial statements that are free from material misstatement, whether due to fraud or error.

Auditor's Responsibility

Our responsibility is to express an opinion on these consolidated financial statements based on our audit. We conducted our audit in accordance with U.S. generally accepted auditing standards. Those standards require that we plan and perform the audit to obtain reasonable assurance about whether the consolidated financial statements are free from material misstatement.

An audit involves performing procedures to obtain audit evidence about the amounts and disclosures in the consolidated financial statements. The procedures selected depend on the auditors' judgment, including the assessment of the risks of material misstatement of the consolidated financial statements, whether due to fraud or error. In making those risk assessments, the auditor considers internal control relevant to the entity's preparation and fair presentation of the consolidated financial statements in order to design audit procedures that are appropriate in the circumstances, but not for the purpose of expressing an opinion on the effectiveness of the entity's internal control. Accordingly, we express no such opinion. An audit also includes evaluating the appropriateness of accounting policies used and the reasonableness of significant accounting estimates made by management, as well as evaluating the overall presentation of the consolidated financial statements.

We believe that the audit evidence we have obtained is sufficient and appropriate to provide a basis for our audit opinion.

Opinion

In our opinion, the financial statements referred to above present fairly, in all material respects, the financial position of ABC Company, Inc. as of December 31, 20XX, and the results of its operations and its cash flows for the year then ended in accordance with U.S. generally accepted accounting principles.

AUDITOR'S SIGNATURE
Auditor's name and address

Date = Last day of any significant field work
This date should not be dated earlier than when the auditor has sufficient audit evidence to support the opinion.

=== Qualified Opinion report ===
Qualified report is given by the auditor in either of these two cases:

1. When the financial statements are materially misstated due to misstatement in one particular account balance, class of transaction or disclosure that does not have pervasive effect on the financial statements.
2. When the auditor is unable to obtain audit evidence regarding particular account balance, class of transaction or disclosure that does not have pervasive effect on the financial statements.

The report is mostly like a Clear Opinion Report and only includes a paragraph viz. Basis for Qualification after Scope paragraph and before Opinion paragraph. Opinion paragraph in addition to its standard wording includes "except for the matter described in Basis for Qualification paragraph the financial statements give true and fair view."

Detailed below:

A Qualified Opinion report is issued when the auditor encountered one of the two types of situations which do not comply with generally accepted accounting principles, however the rest of the financial statements are fairly presented. This type of opinion is very similar to an unqualified or "clean opinion", but the report states that the financial statements are fairly presented with a certain exception which is otherwise misstated. The two types of situations which would cause an auditor to issue this opinion over the Unqualified opinion are:

- Single deviation from GAAP – this type of qualification occurs when one or more areas of the financial statements do not conform with GAAP (e.g. are misstated), but do not affect the rest of the financial statements from being fairly presented when taken as a whole. Examples of this include a company dedicated to a retail business that did not correctly calculate the depreciation expense of its building. Even if this expense is considered material, since the rest of the financial statements do conform with GAAP, then the auditor qualifies the opinion by describing the depreciation misstatement in the report and continues to issue a clean opinion on the rest of the financial statements.
- Limitation of scope – this type of qualification occurs when the auditor could not audit one or more areas of the financial statements, and although they could not be verified, the rest of the financial statements were audited and they conform to GAAP. Examples of this include an auditor not being able to observe and test a company's inventory of goods. If the auditor audited the rest of the financial statements and is reasonably sure that they conform with GAAP, then the auditor simply states that the financial statements are fairly presented, with the exception of the inventory which could not be audited.

The wording of the qualified report is very similar to the Unqualified opinion, but an explanatory paragraph is added to explain the reasons for the qualification after the scope paragraph but before the opinion paragraph. The introductory paragraph is left exactly the same as in the unqualified opinion, while the scope and the opinion paragraphs receive a slight modification in line with the qualification in the explanatory paragraph.

The scope paragraph is edited to include the following phrase in the first sentence, so that the user may be immediately aware of the qualification. This placement also informs the user that, except for the qualification, the rest of the audit was performed without qualifications:

"Except as discussed in the following paragraph, we conducted our audit..."

The opinion paragraph is also edited to include an additional phrase in the first sentence, so that the user is reminded that the auditor's opinion explicitly excludes the qualification expressed. Depending on the type of qualification, the phrase is edited to either state the qualification and the adjustments needed to correct it, or state the scope limitation and that adjustments could have but not necessarily been required in order to correct it.

For a qualification arising from a deviation from GAAP, the following phrase is added to the opinion paragraph, using the depreciation example mentioned above:

"In our opinion, except for the effects of the Company's incorrect determination of depreciation expense, the financial statement referred to in the first paragraph presents fairly, in all material respects, the financial position of..."

For a qualification arising from a scope of limitation, the following phrase is added to the opinion paragraph, using the inventory example mentioned above:

"In our opinion, except for the effects of such adjustments, if any, as might have been determined to be necessary had we been able to perform proper tests and procedures on the Company's inventory, the financial statement referred to in the first paragraph presents fairly, in all material respects, the financial position of...

=== Adverse Opinion report ===
An Adverse Opinion Report is issued on the financial statements of a company when the financial statements are materially misstated and such misstatements have pervasive effect on the financial statements.

An Adverse Opinion is issued when the auditor determines that the financial statements of an auditee are materially misstated and, when considered as a whole, do not conform with GAAP. It is considered the opposite of an unqualified or clean opinion, essentially stating that the information contained is materially incorrect, unreliable, and inaccurate in order to assess the auditee's financial position and results of operations. Investors, lending institutions, and governments very rarely accept an auditee's financial statements if the auditor issued an adverse opinion, and usually request the auditee to correct the financial statements and obtain another audit report.

Generally, an adverse opinion is only given if the financial statements pervasively differ from GAAP. An example of such a situation would be failure of a company to consolidate a material subsidiary.

The wording of the adverse report is similar to the qualified report. The scope paragraph is modified accordingly and an explanatory paragraph is added to explain the reason for the adverse opinion after the scope paragraph but before the opinion paragraph. However, the most significant change in the adverse report from the qualified report is in the opinion paragraph, where the auditor clearly states that the financial statements are not in accordance with GAAP, which means that they, as a whole, are unreliable, inaccurate, and do not present a fair view of the auditee's position and operations.

"In our opinion, because of the situations mentioned above (in the explanatory paragraph), the financial statements referred to in the first paragraph do not present fairly, in all material respects, the financial position of..."

=== Disclaimer of Opinion report ===
A Disclaimer of Opinion is issued in either of the following cases:

- When the auditor is not independent or when there is conflict of interest.
- When the limitation on scope is imposed by client, as a result the auditor is unable to obtain sufficient appropriate audit evidence.
- When there are significant uncertainties in the business of client.

The audit report changes significantly when there is Disclaimer of opinion. An additional paragraph "Basis for Disclaimer" is added in audit report which is placed after Scope paragraph and before Opinion paragraph. In Scope paragraph the wording changes to "We were engaged to audit the financial statements of XYZ Co. Ltd." from "We have audited the financial statements of XYZ Co. Ltd." In Opinion paragraph wording changes to "We do not express an opinion on the financial statements of XYZ Co. Ltd. due to situations explained in Basis for Disclaimer paragraph"

A Disclaimer of Opinion, commonly referred to simply as a Disclaimer, is issued when the auditor could not form and consequently refuses to present an opinion on the financial statements. This type of report is issued when the auditor tried to audit an entity but could not complete the work due to various reasons and does not issue an opinion. The disclaimer of opinion report can be traced back to 1949, when the Statement on Auditing Procedure No. 23: Recommendation Made To Clarify Accountant's Representations When Opinion Is Not Expressed was published in order to provide guidance to auditors in presenting a disclaimer.

Statements on Auditing Standards (SAS) provide certain situations where a disclaimer of opinion may be appropriate:

- A lack of independence, or material conflict(s) of interest, exist between the auditor and the auditee (SAS No. 26)
- There are significant scope limitations, whether intentional or not, which hinder the auditor's work in obtaining evidence and performing procedures (SAS No. 58);
- There is a substantial doubt about the auditee's ability to continue as a going concern or, in other words, continue operating (SAS No. 59)
- There are significant uncertainties within the auditee (SAS No. 79).

Although this type of opinion is rarely used, the most common examples where disclaimers are issued include audits where the auditee willfully hides or refuses to provide evidence and information to the auditor in significant areas of the financial statements, where the auditee is facing significant legal and litigation issues in which the outcome is uncertain (usually government investigations), and where the auditee has going concern issues (the auditee may not continue operating in the near future). Investors, lending institutions, and governments typically reject an auditee's financial statements if the auditor disclaimed an opinion, and will request the auditee to correct the situations the auditor mentioned and obtain another audit report.

A disclaimer of opinion differs substantially from the rest of the auditor's reports because it provides very little information regarding the audit itself, and includes an explanatory paragraph stating the reasons for the disclaimer. Although the report still contains the letterhead, the auditee's name and address, the auditor's signature and address, and the report's issuance date, every other paragraph is modified extensively, and the scope paragraph is entirely omitted since the auditor is basically stating that an audit could not be realized.

In the introductory paragraph, the first phrase changes from "We have audited" to "We were engaged to audit" in order to let the user know that the auditee commissioned an audit, but does not mention that the auditor necessarily completed the audit. Additionally, since the audit was not completely and/or adequately performed, the auditor refuses to accept any responsibility by omitting the last sentence of the paragraph. The scope paragraph is omitted in its entirety since, effectively, no audit was performed. Similar to the qualified and the adverse opinions, the auditor must briefly discuss the situations for the disclaimer in an explanatory paragraph. Finally, the opinion paragraph changes completely, stating that an opinion could not be formed and is not expressed because of the situations mentioned in the previous paragraphs.

The following is a draft of the three main paragraphs of a disclaimer of opinion because of inadequate accounting records of an auditee, which is considered a significant scope of limitation:

We were engaged to audit the accompanying balance sheet of ABC Company, Inc. (the "Company") as of December 31, 20XX and the related statements of income and cash flows for the year then ended. These financial statements are the responsibility of the Company's management.

The Company does not maintain adequate accounting records to provide sufficient information for the preparation of the basic financial statements. The Company's accounting records do not constitute a double-entry system which can produce financial statements.

Because of the significance of the matters discussed in the preceding paragraphs, the scope of our work was not sufficient to enable us to express, and we do not express, an opinion of the financial statements referred to in the first paragraph.

=== Auditor's report on internal controls of public companies ===
Following the enactment of the Sarbanes-Oxley Act of 2002, the Public Company Accounting Oversight Board (PCAOB) was established in order to monitor, regulate, inspect, and discipline audit and public accounting firms of public companies. The PCAOB Auditing Standards No. 2 now requires auditors of public companies to include an additional disclosure in the opinion report regarding the auditee's internal controls, and to opine about the company's and auditor's assessment on the company's internal controls over financial reporting. These new requirements are commonly referred to as the COSO Opinion.

The auditor's report is modified to include all necessary disclosures by either presenting the report subsequent to the report on the financial statements, or combining both reports into one auditor's report. The following is an example of the former version of adding a separate report immediately after the auditor's report on financial statements.

Internal control over financial reporting

We have also audited management's assessment, included in the accompanying Management's Annual Report on Internal Control Over Financial Reporting, that the Company maintained effective internal control over financial reporting as of December 31, 20XX, based on criteria established in Internal Control—Integrated Framework issued by the Committee of Sponsoring Organizations of the Treadway Commission ("COSO").The Company's management is responsible for maintaining effective internal control over financial reporting and for its assessment of the effectiveness of internal control over financial reporting. Our responsibility is to express an opinion on management's assessment and on the effectiveness of the Company's internal control over financial reporting based on our audit. We conducted our audits in accordance with the standards of the Public Company Accounting Oversight Board (United States). Those standards require that we plan and perform the audit to obtain reasonable assurance about whether effective internal control over financial reporting was maintained in all material respects. Our audit of internal control over financial reporting included obtaining an understanding of internal control over financial reporting, evaluating management's assessment, testing and evaluating the design and operating effectiveness of internal control, and performing such other procedures as we considered necessary in the circumstances. We believe that our audit provides a reasonable basis for our opinion.

A company's internal control over financial reporting is a process designed to provide reasonable assurance regarding the reliability of financial reporting and the preparation of financial statements for external purposes in accordance with generally accepted accounting principles. A company's internal control over financial reporting includes those policies and procedures that (1) pertain to the maintenance of records that, in reasonable detail, accurately and fairly reflect the transactions and dispositions of the assets of the company; (2) provide reasonable assurance that transactions are recorded as necessary to permit preparation of financial statements in accordance with generally accepted accounting principles, and that receipts and expenditures of the company are being made only in accordance with authorizations of management and directors of the company; and (3) provide reasonable assurance regarding prevention or timely detection of unauthorized acquisition, use, or disposition of the company's assets that could have a material effect on the financial statements.

Because of its inherent limitations, internal control over financial reporting may not prevent or detect misstatements. Also, projections of any evaluation of effectiveness to future periods are subject to the risk that controls may become inadequate because of changes in conditions, or that the degree of compliance with the policies or procedures may deteriorate.

In our opinion, management's assessment that ABC Company maintained effective internal control over financial reporting as of December 31, 20XX, is fairly stated, in all material respects, based on criteria established in Internal Control—Integrated Framework issued by COSO. Furthermore, in our opinion, ABC Company maintained, in all material respects, effective internal control over financial reporting as of December 31, 20XX, based on criteria established in Internal Control—Integrated Framework issued by COSO.

=== Going concern ===
Going concern is a term which means that an entity will continue to operate in the near future which is generally more than next 12 months, so long as it generates or obtains enough resources to operate. If the auditee is not a going concern, it means that the entity might not be able to sustain itself within the next twelve months. Auditors are required to consider the going concern of an auditee before issuing a report. If the auditee is a going concern, the auditor does not modify his/her report in any way. However, if the auditor considers that the auditee is not a going concern, or will not be a going concern in the near future, then the auditor is required to include an explanatory paragraph before the opinion paragraph or following the opinion paragraph, in the audit report explaining the situation, which is commonly referred to as the going concern disclosure. Such an opinion is called an "unqualified modified opinion".

Unfortunately, many auditors are increasingly reluctant to include this disclosure in their opinions, since it is considered a "self-fulfilling prophecy" by some. This is because a disclosure for a lack of going concern is viewed negatively by investors, lending institutions, and credit agencies, and therefore reduces the chance that the auditee may obtain the capital or borrowing it needs to survive once the disclosure is made. If this situation occurs, the auditee is more likely to stop being a going concern while the auditor loses potential future audit engagements, and so the auditor may be pressured to avoid including a going concern disclosure. In a study performed on 2001 bankruptcies, nearly half (48%) of selected public companies who faced bankruptcy in 2001 did not have a "going concern disclosure" in the previous auditor's reports. Additionally, 12 of the 20 largest bankruptcies in U.S. history occurred between 2001 and 2002 and none of them had a "going concern disclosure" in their previous auditor's report.

As for the actual wording of the auditor's report, when a lack of going concern is determined by the auditor, the disclosure paragraph should state the situation, state the auditor's determination, and state the auditee's plan to correct the situation. The disclosure paragraph should immediately follow the opinion paragraph.

The following is the most widely used format of the paragraph which, in this case, deals with a company that has recurring losses:

The accompanying financial statements have been prepared assuming that the Company will continue as a going concern. As discussed in Note (X) to the financial statements, the Company has suffered recurring losses and has a net capital deficiency. These conditions raise substantial doubt about its ability to continue as a going concern. Management's plans in regard to these matters are also described in Note (X). The financial statements do not include any adjustments relating to the recoverability and classification of asset carrying amounts or the amount and classification of liabilities that might result should the Company be unable to continue as a going concern.

=== Other explanatory information and paragraphs ===
Although the auditor reports mentioned above are the standard reports for financial statement audits, the auditor may add additional information to the report if it is deemed necessary without changing the overall opinion of the report. Usually, this additional information is included after the opinion paragraph, although some situations require that the additional information be included in paragraphs before the opinion paragraph. The most frequent paragraphs include:

- Limiting distribution of the report – In some occasions, the audit report is restricted to a specified user and the auditor includes this restriction in the report, such as a report for financial statements made in cash basis which are prepared for tax purposes only, financial statements for a wholly owned subsidiary whose sole user of its financial statements is its parent company, etc.
- Additional or supplemental information – Certain auditees include additional and/or supplemental information with their financial statements which is not directly related to the financial statements. Examples due to size, time, location, and/or technical constraints. When the main auditor has to rely on another auditor's work, the main auditor may either accept responsibility for the component's information and not modify the audit report, or may choose to disclaim the audit on the specific component, stating that the main auditor did not audit the component, that another auditor audited the component, that the component's audited information is therefore the responsibility of another auditor, and that the main auditor is simply including it in the original auditee's information. If used, this disclaimer is usually included in the introductory paragraph.

=== Auditor's reports on financial statements in different countries ===
The auditor's report usually does not vary from country to country, although some countries do require either additional or less wording. In the United States, auditors are required to include in the scope paragraphs a phrase stating that they conducted their audit "in accordance with generally accepted auditing standards in the United States of America", and, in the opinion paragraph, state whether the financial statements are presented "in conformity with generally accepted accounting principles in the United States of America". Some countries, such as the Philippines, use similar reports to those issued in the United States, with the exception that second paragraph would state that the audit was conducted in accordance with Philippine Standards on Auditing, and that the financial statements are in accordance with Philippine Financial Reporting Standards.

== Opinion shopping ==
Opinion shopping is a term used by external auditors and, after the Enron and Arthur Andersen accounting scandals, the media and general public refer to auditees who contract or reject auditors based on the type of opinion report they will issue on the auditee. The underlying principles of this concept are that auditees determine the compensation to auditors for their work (called "audit fees") as well as awarding future audit engagements; that such fees are the auditor's main source of income; that certain auditees may try to contract auditors that will issue audit opinions based on the auditees' needs; and that certain auditors are willing to comply with such demands so long as they are assured future audit engagements.

The most common example is an auditee that knows that the current auditor is going to issue a qualified, adverse, or disclaimer of opinion report, who then rescinds the audit engagement before the opinion is issued, and subsequently "shops" for another auditor who is willing to issue an "unqualified" opinion, regardless of any qualifying situations mentioned in the previous sections. However, opinion shopping is not limited to auditees contracting auditors based on issuing opinions. It also includes auditors who are over-pleasing to auditees by issuing unqualified reports without properly auditing, or by simply overlooking material issues affecting the audit. These auditors' objective is to appear much more attractive and easy-going than other auditors in order to secure future audit engagements and fees.

Although the great majority of auditors are not willing to jeopardize their profession and reputation for guaranteed audit fees, there are some that will issue opinions solely based on obtaining or maintaining audit engagements. This includes auditors who knowingly emit unmodified unqualified opinions for auditees who are engaged in illegal activities, auditees who have caused a material limitation of scope, auditees that have a lack of going concern, or auditees who present fraudulent financial statements (e.g. Enron and Arthur Andersen). This situation is a clear conflict of interest which should hinder an auditor's independence and the ability to audit (AICPA Code of Ethics), but some auditors willingly ignore this statute.

Recent laws and industry standards have been implemented in order to correct this situation, which include the Sarbanes-Oxley Act and the AICPA's practice-monitoring program and Peer Review Program, which are in some cases voluntary, and in other cases, required.

== Other engagements and reports ==
There are various other audits and evaluations which an external auditor performs in addition to the engagements mentioned in the previous sections, each with their respective standard report(s):

- Certification audit reports (for example, an ISO 9000 audit report)
- Compilations (not an audit, but requires a report)
- Due diligence
- Environmental audit report
- Financial forecasts
- Filing of a public company's Form 10-Q and Form 10-K
- Agreed upon procedures
- Internal audit reports
- Regulatory inspection reports
- Review of financial statements (an overview with very limited auditing procedures)
- Fraud and materiality memo
- Second opinion
- XBRL assurance
- Information security audit, information technology audit or information technology security audit

=== Report to the audit committee or board ===
The auditor's report on the financial statements typically provides very limited details on the procedures and findings of the audit. In contrast, auditors provide much more detail to the board of directors or to the audit committee of the board. Beginning in 2002, many countries have tasked the audit committee with primary responsibility over the audit. For example, in the United States, section 204 of the Sarbanes-Oxley Act passed in 2002 required auditors to communicate certain information to audit committees, which were required to be entirely independent, and also made the audit committee responsible for the auditor's hiring. In August 2012, the U.S. Public Company Accounting Oversight Board finalized Auditing Standard No. 16, which requires additional communications to the audit committee.

== See also ==
- Financial audit
- Internal audit
- Generally Accepted Auditing Standards
- International Standards on Auditing
