= Public Company Accounting Oversight Board =

American overseer of audits of public companies

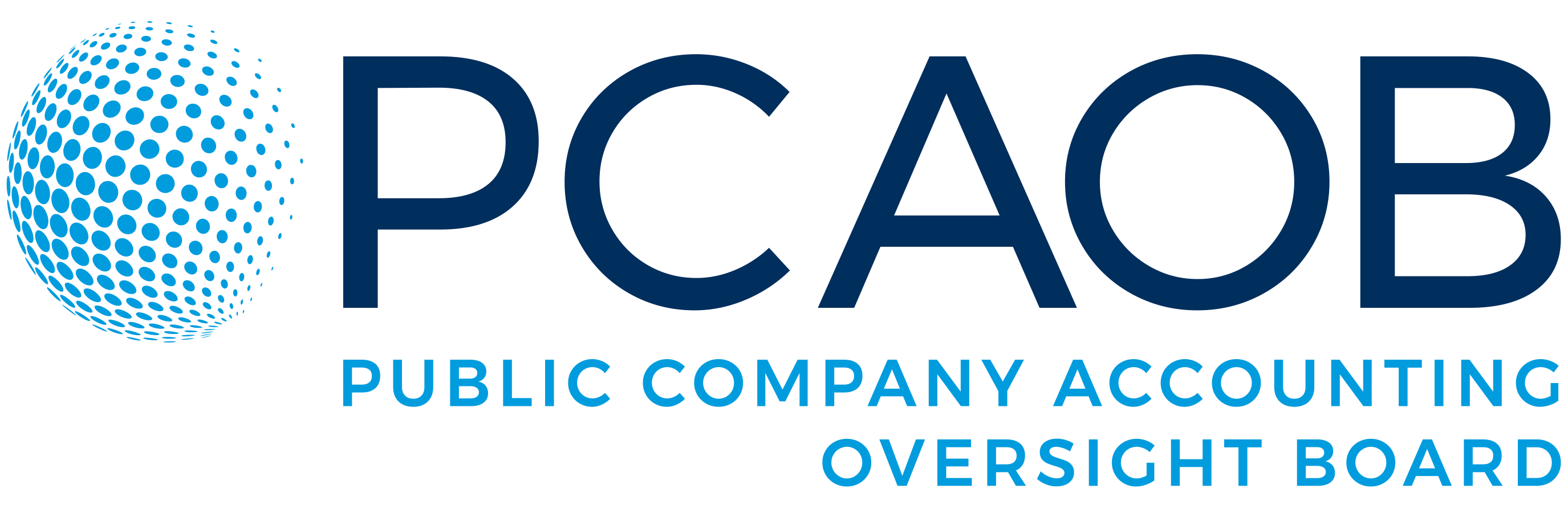
- Founded: July 30, 2002; 24 years ago
- Tax ID no.: 74-3073065
- Legal status: 501(c)(1)
- Purpose: The PCAOB oversees the audits of public companies and SEC-registered brokers and dealers in order to protect investors and further the public interest in the preparation of informative, accurate, and independent audit reports.
- Headquarters: Washington, D.C., U.S.
- Chairperson: Demetrios (Jim) Logothetis
- Board member: George R. Botic; Steven D. Laughton; Mark A. Calabria; Kyle S. Hauptman
- Website: pcaobus.org

The Public Company Accounting Oversight Board (PCAOB) is a nonprofit corporation created by the Sarbanes–Oxley Act of 2002 to oversee the audits of US-listed public companies. The PCAOB also oversees the audits of broker-dealers, including compliance reports filed pursuant to federal securities laws, to promote investor protection. All PCAOB rules and standards must be approved by the U.S. Securities and Exchange Commission (SEC).

== Purpose ==
In creating the Public Company Accounting Oversight Board (PCAOB), the Sarbanes-Oxley Act required that auditors of U.S. public companies be subject to external and independent oversight for the first time in history. Previously, the profession was self-regulated. Congress vested the PCAOB with expanded oversight authority over the audits of brokers and dealers registered with the SEC in 2010 through the Dodd–Frank Wall Street Reform and Consumer Protection Act.

The PCAOB has four primary functions in overseeing these auditors: registration, inspection, standard-setting and enforcement.

Registered accounting firms that issue audit reports for more than 100 issuers (primarily public companies) are required to be inspected annually. This is usually around 10 firms. Registered firms that issue audit reports for 100 or fewer issuers are generally inspected at least once every three years. Many of these firms are international non-U.S. firms. In addition, the PCAOB annually inspects at least 5 percent of all registered firms that play a substantial role in the audit of an issuer but that do not issue audit reports for issuers themselves. In 2011, the board adopted an interim inspection program for the audits of broker-dealers, while the board considers the scope and other elements of a permanent inspection program.

In 2017, auditors began filing information on the names of engagement partners and other audit firms that participate in the audits of U.S. public companies. The PCAOB created a searchable database called AuditorSearch for investors and others to know more about who is leading and participating in audits through these filings, adding more specific data points to the mix of information that can be used when evaluating audit quality.

The PCAOB also adopted a new standard in 2017 to enhance the usefulness of the standard auditor's report by providing additional and important information to investors, such as the critical audit matters (CAMs) that auditors communicate to the audit committees of the public companies they are auditing. These are matters that are related to accounts or disclosures that are material to the financial statements, and involved especially challenging, subjective, or complex auditor judgment. The CAMs requirement goes into effect in 2019 and 2020. Beginning in 2017, the updated auditor's report also includes the tenure of the auditor with that company.

== Organizational overview ==
The PCAOB has five board members, including a chairman, each of whom is appointed by the SEC, after consultation with the chairman of the board of governors of the Federal Reserve System and the Secretary of the Treasury. Two board members, and only two members, must be Certified Public Accountants. If the PCAOB chairman is one of them, he or she may not have been a practicing CPA for at least five years prior to being appointed to the board. Each member serves full-time, for staggered five-year terms. The board's budget, approved by the SEC each year, is funded by fees paid by the companies and broker-dealers who rely on the audit firms overseen by the board. The organization has a staff of about 800 and offices in 11 states in addition to its headquarters in Washington.

The PCAOB's current chair is Erica Y. Williams, who was sworn in on January 10, 2022, by the SEC. From 2017 to 2021, the chairman was William D. Duhnke III, a former staff director and general counsel to three Senate committees. From 2011 to 2017, James R. Doty served as chairman, a former SEC general counsel and a former partner at the law firm of Baker Botts LLP. He was preceded by Mark W. Olson, a former member of the Federal Reserve board of governors. The first chairman in place at the PCAOB was former president and chief executive officer of the Federal Reserve Bank of New York, William Joseph McDonough. The SEC first appointed William H. Webster to the position, a prominent lawyer and former director of both the FBI and CIA. He resigned after several weeks and prior to the board's first official meeting (as explained below).

== Powers ==
Under Section 101 of the Sarbanes-Oxley Act, the PCAOB has the power to:

- register public accounting firms that prepare audit reports for issuers and broker-dealers;
- set auditing, quality control, ethics, independence and other standards relating to the preparation of audit reports of issuers;
- conduct inspections of PCAOB-registered public accounting firms;
- conduct investigations and disciplinary proceedings, and impose sanctions, against registered public accounting firms and associated persons of such firms (including fines of up to $100,000 against individual auditors, and $2 million against audit firms);
- perform such other duties or functions as the board determines are necessary or appropriate to promote high professional standards among, and improve the quality of audit services offered by, registered public accounting firms and their employees;
- sue and be sued, complain and defend, in its corporate name and through its own counsel, with the approval of the SEC, in any Federal, State or other court;
- conduct its operations, maintain offices, and exercise all of its rights and powers in any part of the United States, without regard to any qualification, licensing or other provision of state or [municipal] law;
- hire staff, accountants, attorneys and other agents as may be necessary or appropriate to the PCAOB's mission (with salaries set at a level comparable to private-sector self-regulatory, accounting, technical, supervisory, or other staff or management positions, as set out by the Sarbanes-Oxley Act to attract the highly skilled and experienced professionals needed to oversee global accounting firms);
- allocate, assess, and collect accounting support fees that fund the board; and
- enter into contracts, execute instruments, incur liabilities, and do any and all other acts and things necessary, appropriate, or incidental to the conduct of its operations and the exercise of its powers under the Sarbanes-Oxley Act.

Auditors of public companies are prohibited by the Sarbanes-Oxley Act to provide non-audit services, such as consulting, to their audit clients. Congress made certain exceptions for tax services, which are therefore overseen by the PCAOB. This prohibition was made as a result of allegations, in cases such as Enron and WorldCom, that auditors' independence from their clients' managers had been compromised because of the large fees that audit firms were earning from these ancillary services.

In addition, as part of the PCAOB's investigative powers, the board may require that audit firms, or any person associated with an audit firm, provide testimony or documents in its (or his or her) possession. If the firm or person refuses to provide this testimony or these documents, the PCAOB may suspend or bar that person or entity from the public audit industry. The PCAOB may also seek the SEC's assistance in issuing subpoenas for testimony or documents from individuals or entities not registered with the PCAOB.

The board's Office of the Chief Auditor advises the board on the establishment of auditing and related professional practice standards.

Each of these powers is subject to approval and oversight by the SEC. Individuals and audit firms subject to PCAOB oversight may appeal PCAOB decisions (including any disciplinary actions) to the SEC and the SEC has the power to modify or overturn PCAOB rules.

== Inspection reports ==
The PCAOB periodically issues Inspection Reports of registered public accounting firms. While a large part of these reports is made public (called "Part I"), portions of the inspection reports that deal with criticisms of, or potential defects in, the audit firm's quality control systems are not made public if the firm addresses those matters to the board's satisfaction within 12 months after the report date. Those portions are made public (called "Part II"), however, if (1) the board determines that a firm's efforts to address the criticisms or potential defects were not satisfactory, or (2) the firm makes no submission evidencing any such efforts.

== History ==
The PCAOB was created in response to an ever increasing number of accounting "restatements" (corrections of past financial statements) by public companies during the 1990s, and a series of high-profile accounting scandals and record-setting bankruptcies by large public companies, notably those in 2002 involving WorldCom and Enron, and the audit firm for both companies, Arthur Andersen. Prior to the creation of the PCAOB, the audit profession was self-regulated through its trade group, the American Institute of Certified Public Accountants (AICPA). The AICPA's Public Oversight Board was formally dissolved on March 31, 2002, though its members had resigned en masse in January 2002 to protest then-SEC Chairman Harvey Pitt's proposal for a new private auditor oversight body to regulate the profession (a proposal which would evolve into the PCAOB).

=== Appointment of first Chairman ===
The SEC named William H. Webster, to be the first PCAOB Chairman. He was a prominent lawyer and former director of both the FBI and CIA. This appointment was controversial, however, for while Webster was widely recognized for his integrity and intellect, two of the SEC's five Commissioners (Harvey Goldschmid and Roel Campos) believed that Pitt had not properly vetted the candidates or consulted with them on the appointment (and had previously agreed with them to appoint TIAA-CREF Chairman John Biggs as PCAOB Chairman). In one of the most contentious SEC public hearings, these two Commissioners publicly criticized the process of the appointment (though not Webster himself). Webster nonetheless was approved by the SEC by a 3–2 vote to become the PCAOB's first chairman.

Just a few weeks after Webster was appointed to the PCAOB, however, another controversy erupted when newspapers reported that Webster had served on the board audit committee of U.S. Technologies, a high-technology company being investigated for accounting irregularities. Pitt, whose tenure as SEC Chair had already proven controversial, found himself in an untenable position. One of the claims made by Goldschmid during the rancorous October SEC hearing was that the candidates put forward by Pitt had not been properly vetted. Goldschmid's criticisms seemed prescient, and this, combined with other pressures, led Pitt to announce his resignation from the SEC on election day (November 4, 2002). Webster himself announced his resignation from the PCAOB a week later -– less than three weeks after the PCAOB was set up.

== Constitutional challenge ==
In February 2006, the Free Enterprise Fund and Beckstead and Watts, LLP (a small Nevada-based accounting firm) filed a lawsuit in federal court challenging the constitutionality of the PCAOB. According to the lawsuit, the provision of the Sarbanes-Oxley Act establishing the PCAOB violated the "Appointments Clause" of the U.S. Constitution, since PCAOB Board members should be viewed as "officers of the United States" because of the public purposes PCAOB serves, and, as such, must either be appointed by the president of the United States, with the advice and consent of the U.S. Senate, or by the "head" of a "department", whereas PCAOB's board is appointed by the SEC, rather than by the Chairman of the SEC. The lawsuit also challenged the PCAOB as violating the Constitution's separation of powers clause, since the organization has quasi-executive, -legislative and -judicial functions.

On August 22, 2008, the U.S. Court of Appeals for the District of Columbia Circuit upheld the PCAOB as constitutional. The Court found that board members are inferior officers not required to be appointed by the President, and that the President retains sufficient control of the board via the SEC that the board does not violate the separation of powers clause.

The United States Supreme Court granted certiorari on May 18, 2009, to consider three questions:

1. Whether the Sarbanes-Oxley Act of 2002 violates the Constitution's separation of powers by vesting members of the [PCAOB] with far-reaching executive power while completely stripping the President of all authority to appoint or remove those members or otherwise supervise or control their exercise of that power, or whether, as the court of appeals held, the Act is constitutional because Congress can restrict the President's removal authority in any way it "deems best for the public interest."
2. Whether the court of appeals erred in holding that, under the Appointments Clause, PCAOB members are "inferior officers" directed and supervised by the [SEC], where the SEC lacks any authority to supervise those members personally, to remove the members for any policy-related reason or to influence the members' key investigative functions, merely because the SEC may review some of the members' work product.
3. If PCAOB members are inferior officers, whether the Act's provision for their appointment by the SEC violates the Appointments Clause either because the SEC is not a "Department" or because the five commissioners, acting collectively, are not the "Head" of the SEC.

Free Enterprise Fund v. Public Company Accounting Oversight Board was argued on Dec. 7, 2009. In addition to the PCAOB, the United States (represented by Solicitor General Elena Kagan) also appeared as a respondent in the case and argued separately, defending the constitutionality of the Sarbanes-Oxley Act. Thirteen amici, ranging from libertarian think-tanks like the Cato Institute to managers of state public-employee pension funds, filed briefs in the case.

On June 28, 2010, in a five-justice majority opinion written by Chief Justice John G. Roberts, the Supreme Court found the appointment provisions of the Act to be constitutional, but struck down the for-cause removal provision. The Court did not accept petitioners' argument that the constitutional infirmity made all of the board's prior activity unconstitutional; rather, it simply severed the for-cause removal clause from the rest of Sarbanes-Oxley, leaving the board itself intact.

== See also ==
- Holding Foreign Companies Accountable Act
- National Financial Reporting Authority (NFRA)
- List of financial supervisory authorities by country
