= Statements on Auditing Procedure =

Statements on Auditing Procedure were issued by the Committee on Auditing Procedure of AICPA from 1939 to 1972. The Committee issued 54 SAPs before it became the Auditing Standards Executive Committee (AcSEC) and began issuing Statements on Auditing Standards.Statement on Auditing Standards No. 1 summarized and superseded the 54 SAPs.

== List of Statements on Auditing Procedure ==
No.	Official title	Issued on
1	Extensions of auditing procedure full-text	1939 October
2	Auditor's opinion on the basis of a restricted examination full-text	1939 December
3	Inventories and receivables of department stores, instalment houses, chain stores, and other retailers full-text	1940 February
4	Clients' written representations regarding inventories, liabilities, and other matters full-text	1941 March
5	Revised S.E.C. rule on "accountants' certificates" full-text	1941 February
6	Revised S.E.C. rule on "accountants' certificates"(continued) full-text	1941 March
7	Contingency liability under policies with mutual insurance companies full-text	1941 March
8	Interim financial statements and the auditor's report thereon full-text	1941 September
9	Accountants' reports on examinations of securities and similar investments under the Investment Company Act full-text	1941 December
10	Auditing under wartime conditions full-text	1942 June
11	Auditor's opinion on the basis of a restricted examination : (no. 2) full-text	1942 September
12	Amendment to Extensions of auditing procedure full-text	1942 October
13	Auditor's opinion on the basis of a restricted examination, (no. 3); face-amount certificate companies full-text	1942 December
14	Confirmation of public utility accounts receivable full-text	1942 December
15	Disclosure of the effect of wartime uncertainties on financial statements full-text	1942 December
16	Case studies on inventories full-text	1942 December
17	Physical inventories in wartime full-text	1942 December
18	Confirmation of receivables from the government full-text	1943 January
19	Confirmation of receivables : (positive and negative methods) full-text	1943 November
20	Termination of fixed-price supply contracts; Examination of contractors' statements of proposed settlements full-text	1943 December
21	Wartime government regulations full-text	1944 July
22	References to the independent accountant in securities registrations full-text	1945 May
23	Clarification of accountant's report when opinion is omitted full-text	1947 December
23 revised	Clarification of accountant's report when opinion is omitted full-text	1949 December
24	Revision in short-form accountant's report or certificate full-text	1948 October
25	Events subsequent to the date of financial statements full-text	1954 October
26	Reporting on use of "other procedures." full-text	1956 April
27	Long-form reports full-text	1957 July
28	Special reports (applicability of reporting standards in special circumstances) full-text	1957 October
29	Scope of the independent auditor's review of internal control full-text	1958 October
30	Responsibilities and functions of the independent auditor in the examination of financial statements full-text	1960 September
31	Consistency full-text	1961 October
32	Qualifications and disclaimers (clarification of reporting standards) full-text	1962 September
33	Auditing standards and procedures full-text	1963
34	Long-term investments full-text	1965 September
35	Letters for underwriters full-text	1965 November
36	Revision of "Extensions of auditing procedure" relating to inventories full-text	1966 August
37	Special report : public warehouses : controls and auditing procedures for goods held full-text	1966 September
38	Unaudited financial statements full-text	1967 September
39	Working papers full-text	1967 September
40	Reports following a pooling of interests (supersedes paragraphs 35 and 36 of chapter 8 of Statements on auditing procedure no. 33) full-text	1968 October
41	Subsequent discovery of facts existing at the date of the auditor's report full-text	1969 October
42	Reporting when a certified public accountant is not independent full-text	1970 January
43	Confirmation of receivables and observation of inventories (supersedes paragraphs 16-20 of chapter 6 and paragraphs 27-29 of chapter 10 of Statement on auditing procedure no. 33, and Statement on auditing procedure no. 36) full-text	1970 September
44	Reports following a pooling of interests (supersedes Statement on auditing procedure no. 40) full-text	1971 April
45	Using the work and reports of other auditors (supersedes paragraphs 32 and 36 of chapter 10 of Statement on auditing procedure no. 33) full-text	1971 July
46	Piecemeal opinions (supersedes paragraphs 22-25 of chapter 10 of Statement on auditing procedure no. 33 and pertinent portions of paragraph 9 of Statement on auditing procedure no. 34) full-text	1971 July
47	Subsequent events (supersedes chapter 11 of Statement on auditing procedure no. 33) full-text	1971 September
48	Letters for underwriters (supersedes Statement on auditing procedure no. 35) full-text	1971 October
49	Reports on internal control full-text	1971 November
50	Reporting on the statement of changes in financial position (supersedes paragraph 6 of chapter 10 of Statement on auditing procedure no. 33) full-text	1971 November
51	Long-term investments full-text	1972 July
52	Reports on internal control based on criteria established by governmental agencies full-text	1972 October
53	Reporting on consistency and accounting changes (supersedes chapter 8 of statement on auditing procedure no. 33) full-text	1972 November
54	Auditor's study and evaluation of internal control (supersedes chapter 5 of statement on auditing procedure no. 33) full-text	1972 November

== History of Statements on Auditing Procedure ==
The history of the Statements on Auditing Procedures began in 1917 when the American Institute of Accountants (the predecessor organization for the AICPA) was asked by the Federal Trade Commission to prepare a "memorandum on-balance-sheet audits." The resulting document was published in the April 1917 issue of the Federal Reserve Bulletin and reissued in 1918 as a pamphlet. In 1929 the pamphlet was again revised. A third revision was done in 1936.

The Institute determined that, rather than reissuing the 1936 pamphlet, it would, through the Committee on Auditing Procedure, issue Statements on Auditing Procedure that modified and superseded parts of the 1936 pamphlet. The SAPs were "designed to guide the auditor in those areas of specific situations encountered in practice in which he must exercise judgment, situations outside the realm of textbooks, whose function is inherently to describe procedures in general." By 1948, the 1936 pamphlet was considered so out-of-date that it was withdrawn from publication.

In 1951, the first 24 Statements on Auditing Procedure were codified The Codification also contains a summary history of the process of standardizing auditing practice up to 1951 (see pp. 5–8).

In 1954, the Committee on Auditing Procedure finished work on the booklet Generally Accepted Auditing Standards: Their Significance and Scope. This publication responded to the Securities and Exchange Commission's recommendation that the auditor's report make a representation as to compliance with generally accepted auditing standards.

Statement on Procedure no. 33 again codified previous Committee on Auditing Procedure publications, including the 1951 Codification, The 1954 Generally Accepted Auditing Standards, and Statements on Auditing Procedure 25-32.

The final publication of the Committee on Auditing Procedure, Codification of Auditing Standards and Procedures 1, superseded SAPs 33-54. The Statement is now known as Statement on Auditing Standards, no. 1, and began a series of Statements on Auditing Standards (SASs) that are still being issued by the Auditing Standards Board. See Statements on Auditing Standards (USA). Beginning in 1976, these Standards were codified annually as section AU of the AICPA's Professional Standards.
