= Statement on Auditing Standards No. 55 =

Auditing statement issued by the US Auditing Standards Board

Statement on Auditing Standards (SAS) No. 55: Consideration of Internal Control in a Financial Statement Audit, commonly abbreviated as SAS 55, is an auditing statement issued by the Auditing Standards Board of the American Institute of Certified Public Accountants (AICPA) in April 1988. It requires the auditor to obtain an understanding of an entity's internal control sufficient to plan any audit on such entity.
