= CITP =

CITP may stand for:

== Computers and networking - Entertainment control systems (Lighting / Media) ==
- Controller Interface Transport Protocol, an open communications protocol for the integration of visualizers, lighting consoles and media servers

== Law enforcement training ==
- Criminal Investigator Training Program

== Organizations ==
- Center for Information Technology Policy at Princeton University

== Professional certifications ==
- Chartered IT Professional, a designation awarded by the British Computer Society for experienced ICT professionals
- Certified Information Technology Professional, a credential granted by the American Institute of Certified Public Accountants to members with technology expertise
- Certified International Trade Professional, a designation awarded by the Forum for International Trade Training for experienced international trade professionals.
