= Digital Accounting Collection =

The Digital Accounting Collection (DAC) is part of the University of Mississippi Libraries. The collection contains both current and historical accounting materials, with over 2,400 items in digitized searchable full-text format, and over 33,000 bibliographic citations for other materials.

Within the DAC, there are several discrete collections, most in full text. The American Institute of Certified Public Accountants’ non-current professional standards, codes of professional conduct, and exposure drafts relate to professional auditing and accounting standards in the United States. The Academy of Accounting Historians' Journal and Notebook contain, respectively, scholarly research on accounting history and information on the activities of the Academy. The Accounting Pamphlets - Full-Text collection contains searchable full-text accounting pamphlets that are not under copyright. The McMickle and Accounting Pamphlets – Citations Only collections list in searchable indexes an eclectic mix of thousands of accounting monographs. The Photographs and Illustrations collection offers portraits and drawings related to accounting.

== Collections ==
=== The Accounting Historians Journal - Full-Text ===
1974 - June, 2014

The Accounting Historians Journal is available in digital full-text. Included are files and bibliographic records for each issue and for each major item in each issue. From 1974 to 1998, the PDF page image contains embedded searchable text. Having both an image and a searchable text file allows the researcher immediately to check the accuracy of any questionable transcription. Beginning in 1999, native (searchable) PDFs are provided by the publisher. Go to: for a list of Journal issues

=== Accounting Historians Notebook - Full-Text ===
1978 - October, 2016

The Accounting Historians Notebook includes files and bibliographic records for each issue and for each major item in each issue. From 1978 to 2003, the scanned page images have embedded searchable text. Beginning in 2004, native (searchable) PDFs are provided by the publisher. Go to:for a list of issues.

=== AICPA Codes of Professional Conduct ===
The AICPA Codes of Professional Conduct collection includes the following:

1. The ET (ethics) sections from the Professional Standards from 1974 through 2005
2. The BL (by-laws) sections of the Professional Standards from 1974 through 2005
3. Separately published pamphlets of the Code from 1917 through 1997
4. The By-laws as they are included with the Code in the separately issued pamphlets (1917–1997).
5. Commentaries on the Code by A. P. Richardson, John L. Carey, and John L. Carey and William O. Doherty

=== AICPA Exposure Drafts Collection ===
This collection contains drafts of proposed standards and circulated them for comment from the American Institute of Certified Public Accountants, as a standards promulgating body. These drafts represent a critical phase in the standards setting procedure and are studied by practitioners and historians alike. As they were not originally meant to be part of the permanent record, copies of these drafts are often difficult to locate. Non-current drafts are also available digitally. Each bibliographic record is accompanied by a PDF page image file with a searchable text behind each page image.

=== The McMickle Collection ===
The McMickle Collection contains more than 1,200 rate individual accounting titles with more than 500 volumes dating from the 19th century and the oldest volume dating back to 1655. It was donated to the Academy of Accounting Historians and is held by the University of Mississippi at the Patterson School of Accountancy.

=== Accounting Pamphlets Collection ===
Of the thousands of accounting pamphlets in the University of Mississippi’s AICPA collection, some of those in the public domain have been digitized and are available in searchable full-text. These include governmental publications such as the SEC’s Accounting Series Releases (Nos. 1- 140, 1937-1973; search under the title “Accounting Series Release”) and old CPA exams published by the states. Items published prior to 1923 or for which copyright was not renewed are also in the public domain. For example, early 20th-century pamphlets often provided practical guidance to bookkeepers on the accounting for particular trades, industries, or services. The AICPA library collected these ephemeral treasures for over eighty years and many are available digitally. In some instances, a PDF containing page images is provided along with a separate PDF with searchable text. In other instances, only one file containing both the searchable text and the image is provided (reflecting advances in PDF technology).

=== Accounting Pamphlets ===
This is a catalog of over 33,000 accounting pamphlets owned by the University of Mississippi library and originally collected by the American Institute of Certified Public Accountants. Only brief bibliographic citations are given: author, title, publisher and date. When available, the subject classification number from the original AICPA library collection is also included.

The collection includes a wide range of materials ranging from the late nineteenth century through 2000. Besides the traditional pamphlet materials, there are article reprints and clippings from trade journals, individual journal issues containing accounting articles, short runs of professional newsletters from accounting organizations around the world, and legal briefs.

=== Photographs and Illustrations Collection ===
This collection includes the frontispieces of 16th- and 17th-century accounting texts; cartoons and illustrations from 19th- and early 20th-century books, logos, and mastheads; and photographs from early organizational meetings, early journals and books. It also includes pages of the Accounting Historians Journal and Accounting Historians Notebook.

== History ==
The DAC had its origins in the American Institute of Certified Public Accountants’ Library. AICPA's Library began in 1918 with 2,000 books and pamphlets, part of the collection being a donation of Leonard H. Conant, a former president of the organization. An endowment fund organized by George O. May helped sustain the library’s collections through the years.

In August 2001, AICPA transferred its library the University of Mississippi. Service to the AICPA membership as well as the larger scholarly community has continued from the University of Mississippi location. A grant from the Institute of Museums and Library Services provided the funding to begin digitizing some of the rare and unique items in the collection as well as information useful to practicing accountants. The Digital Accounting Collection is the result of these many efforts.

== Technology ==
A number of technologies have been used over the course of the digitization project. Early scanned documents were edited using Adobe Acrobat Professional. More recently, ABBYY FineReader has been used for editing.

Bibliographic data is entered in Dublin Core format using MetaData Builder. Digital objects such as PDFs and JPEG images are attached and displayed using Media Management. Finally, the collection is displayed and searched using the Innovative Interfaces web opac product.
