= Generally Accepted Auditing Standards =

Standards which judge audits

Generally Accepted Auditing Standards, or GAAS are sets of standards against which the quality of audits are performed and may be judged. Several organizations have developed such sets of principles, which vary by territory. In the United States, the standards are promulgated by the Auditing Standards Board, a division of the American Institute of Certified Public Accountants (AICPA).

AU Section 150 states that there are ten standards: three general standards, three fieldwork standards, and four reporting standards. These standards are issued and clarified Statements of Accounting Standards, with the first issued in 1972 to replace previous guidance. Typically, the first number of the AU section refers to which standard applies. However, in 2012 the Clarity Project significantly revised the standards and replaced AU Section 150 with AU Section 200, which does not explicitly discuss the 10 standards.

In the United States, the Public Company Accounting Oversight Board develops standards (Auditing Standards or AS) for publicly traded companies since the 2002 passage of the Sarbanes–Oxley Act; however, it adopted many of the GAAS initially. The GAAS continues to apply to non-public/private companies.

== General ==
1. The examination is to be performed by a person or persons having adequate technical training and proficiency as an auditor.
2. In all matters relating to an assignment, an independence in mental attitude is to be maintained by the auditor or auditors.
3. Due professional care is to be exercised in the performance of the audit and the preparation of the report.

== Standards of Field Work ==
1. The auditor must adequately plan the work and must properly supervise any assistants.
2. The auditor must obtain a sufficient understanding of the entity and its environment, including its internal control, to assess the risk of material misstatement of the financial statements whether due to error or fraud, and to design the nature, timing, and extent of further audit procedures.
3. The auditor must obtain sufficient appropriate audit evidence by performing audit procedures to afford a reasonable basis for an opinion regarding the financial statements under audit.

== Standards of Reporting ==
1. The auditor must state in the auditor's report whether the financial statements are presented in accordance with generally accepted accounting principles.
2. The auditor must identify in the auditor's report those circumstances in which such principles have not been consistently observed in the current period in relation to the preceding period.
3. When the auditor determines that informative disclosures are not reasonably adequate, the auditor must so state in the auditor's report.
4. The auditor must either express an opinion regarding the financial statements, taken as a whole, or state that an opinion cannot be expressed, in the auditor's report. When the auditor cannot express an overall opinion, the auditor should state the reasons therefore in the auditor's report. In all cases where an auditor's name is associated with financial statements, the auditor should clearly indicate the character of the auditor's work, if any, and the degree of responsibility the auditor is taking, in the auditor's report

== Clarity Project ==
In 2004, a project was begun to clarify and converge the standards with the International Standards in Auditing (ISAs). Many of the AU sections are being remapped as part of the Clarity Project. In October 2011, SAS 122 was issued which superseded all previous SASes except 51, 59, 65, 87, and 117-20. In the interim period, these new AU sections are referred to as AU-C until 2014. The AICPA provides a list of the AU-C standards.

== ISAs ==
International Standards on Auditing are stated by the International Auditing and Assurance Standards Board of the International Federation of Accountants. Derivatives of ISAs are used in the audit of several other jurisdictions, including the United Kingdom.

== See also ==
- Statements on Auditing Standards in the United States
- INTOSAI standards for the audit of government entities, related to the International Standards on Auditing
- Comptroller General (disambiguation), Director of Audit (disambiguation)
