= Political campaign accounting =

Political campaign accounting is a specialty practice area of accounting that focuses on developing and implementing financial systems needed by political campaign organizations to conduct efficient campaign operations and to comply with complex financial reporting statutes. It differs from traditional management and financial consultancy in that it incorporates election law requirements and the unique requirements of political campaigns.

== Background in the United States ==
Prior to 1971, few federal and state election laws necessitated the need for professional accounting services. Accountants’ limited involvement in federal election campaigns began with the passage of the Federal Election Campaign Act of 1971 which required financial reporting. The Federal Election Campaign Act Amendments of 1974, with its complex compliance and reporting requirements, created a paradigm shift in the way campaign finances were conducted and expert financial management of political campaigns became an imperative.

In 1976, the American Institute of Certified Public Accountants, identifying the need for increased participation of CPAs in the election process, published in The Journal of Accountancy a cover article entitled “Political Campaign Accounting – new opportunities for the CPA.” The article received national and international exposure in both print media and broadcast news.

The recognition of political campaign accounting as a professional accounting specialization was expanded when in July, 1976, the AICPA, together with autonomous state CPA organizations, assembled a nationwide network of 600 CPAs to advise local Republican and Democratic presidential campaign organizations on the requirements for financial record-keeping and reporting.

Later that month, it held the AICPA Presidential Advisers Conference that included Edwin K. Hall, chief counsel to the Senate Subcommittee on Privileges and Elections, Barry E. Wagman, CPA, author of The Democratic Party Campaign Treasurer's Handbook, two members of the Federal Election Commission and other prominent government and accounting professionals experienced in the financial management of political campaigns.
