= Mary Painter Garin =

American economist (1920–1991)

Mary Painter Garin (1920–1991) was an American economist. During World War II, she worked for the Office of Strategic Services, devising statistical models to estimate the size of the German submarine fleet. After the war she worked with the Federal Reserve and the Federal Reserve Bank of New York. She moved to Paris in 1948 as part of the group of economists overseeing the Marshall Plan. She later worked with the Organisation for Economic Co-operation and Development.

Painter was born in Minneapolis, Minnesota, and graduated from Swarthmore College. In France, she befriended the writer James Baldwin and corresponded with him throughout his life.

== Early life and education ==
Mary S. Painter was born in Minneapolis, Minnesota. She earned a degree with high honors from Swarthmore College in 1942.

== Career ==
Following her graduation, Painter worked for the Board of Economic Warfare. She later went to work for the Office of Strategic Services (OSS). She innovated techniques used in the analysis of the military capabilities of Nazi Germany, developing a statistical model allowing for an estimation of the size of the German submarine fleet in the North Atlantic. After the war, her model was described by The New York Times as "startlingly accurate".

After World War II, Painter served in Washington at the Federal Reserve Board of Governors. She also served at the Federal Reserve Bank of New York. She used newly devised concepts from the Department of Commerce to make calculations of the United States gross national product in the 10 years after World War I. Her findings were published in September 1945 in the Federal Reserve Bulletin in the article "Estimates of Gross National Product, 1919 Through 1928".

Professionally, she was known as "Miss Painter", and she travelled to Paris in 1948 as part of the initial group of economists staffing the European headquarters of the Marshall Plan. In this role she analyzed the economies of Germany and France with the U.S. mission to the North Atlantic Treaty Organization and other organizations in the region. She continued this work until 1960 and then returned to the United States where she worked with Emile Benoit of Columbia University on problems of disarmament and arms control for two years.

Painter returned to France in 1962 and joined the Organisation for Economic Co-operation and Development, which succeeded the Organisation for European Economic Co-operation.

== Personal life and death ==
Painter was an accomplished cook. She married French chef Georges Garin in 1969. He was the proprietor of Chez Garin on the Left Bank. After she retired from the OECD, she became la Patronne of Chez Garin. In 1973 they closed the restaurant and opened another, La Lingousto, in Solliès-Toucas.

Painter was a friend of writer James Baldwin. They shared correspondence for the remainder of his life. He dedicated his 1962 novel Another Country to her.

Following Georges Garin's death in 1979, she continued to live in Solliès-Toucas. She died on 21 October 1991 in Toulon. According to her niece, Sarah Wells, Garin died of cardiac arrest.
