= Chartered Global Management Accountant =

Professional designation

Chartered Global Management Accountant (CGMA) is a professional management accounting designation issued beginning in January 2012. The Chartered Global Management Accountant's mission is to promote the science of management accounting on global stage.

== Overview ==
The Chartered Global Management Accountant (CGMA) is the most widely held management accounting designation in the world with more than 137,000 holders. It recognizes professionals who have advanced proficiency in finance, operations, strategy and management and is underpinned by global research to maintain relevance with employers, and develop competencies most in demand. The CGMA designation is specifically for certified public accountants specializing in management accounting.

Two of the world's leading accountancy bodies – the Chartered Institute of Management Accountants (CIMA) and the American Institute of Certified Public Accountants (AICPA) – launched the Chartered Global Management Accountant (CGMA) designation in 2012 to meet growing employer demand for finance professionals with an expanded skillset.

There are two pathways to becoming a CGMA designation holder, each with education, experience and assessments designed to build on your existing knowledge and career achievements:

Those who live in North America, Central America or South America would obtain the CGMA through the AICPA Pathway. Those who live in Europe, Asia (including the Middle East, and the Pacific), or Africa would obtain the CGMA through the CIMA Pathway.
