= Stephen Poloz =

9th governor of the Bank of Canada from 2013 to 2020

Stephen Poloz OC
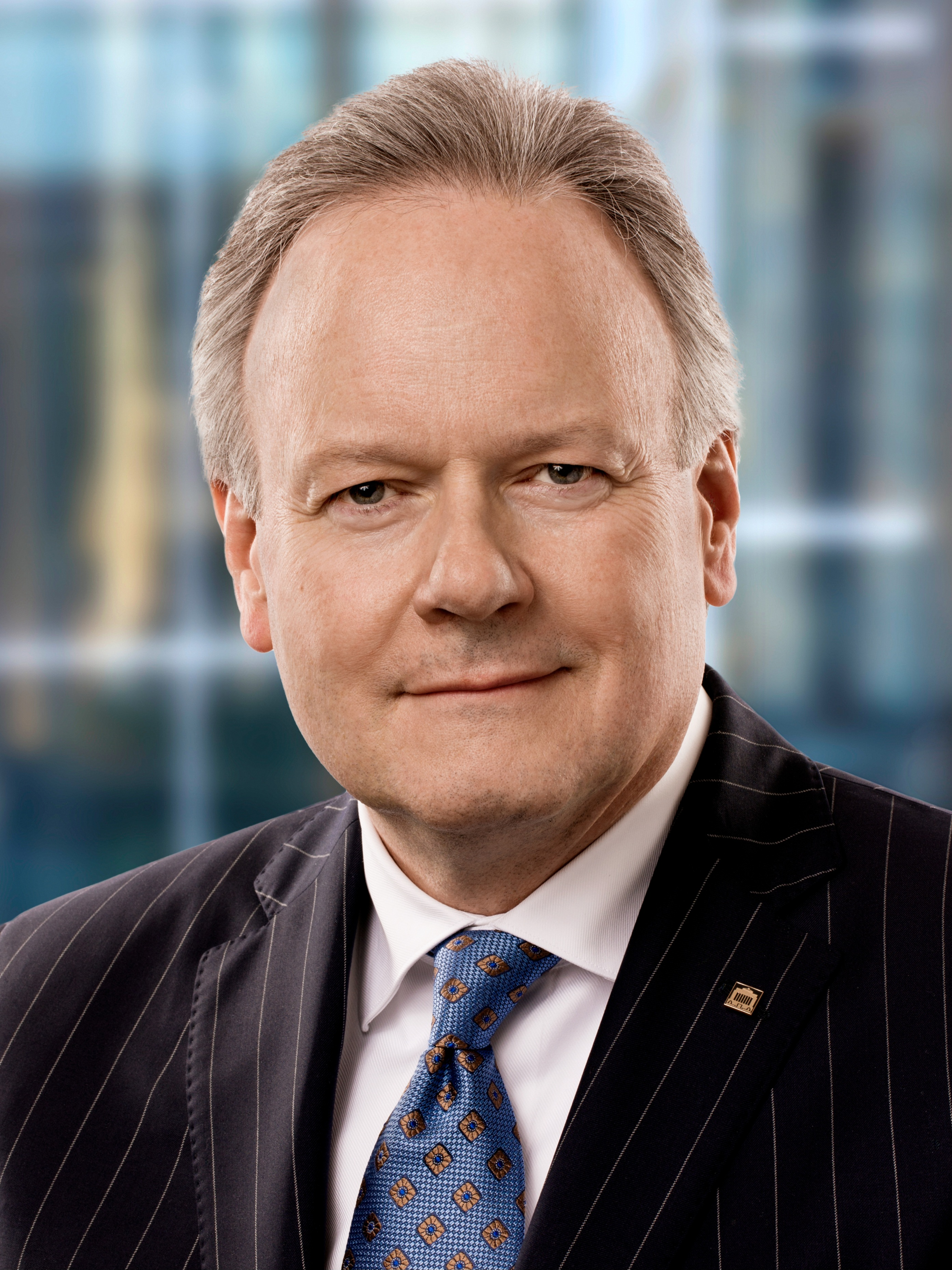
- Poloz in 2019

9th Governor of the Bank of Canada
- In office June 3, 2013 – June 3, 2020
- Preceded by: Mark Carney
- Succeeded by: Tiff Macklem

President and CEO of Export Development Canada
- In office 2010–2013

Personal details
- Born: Stephen Shawn Poloz; 1955 (age 70–71) Oshawa, Ontario, Canada
- Spouse: Valerie Poloz
- Children: 2
- Education: Queen's University; University of Western Ontario
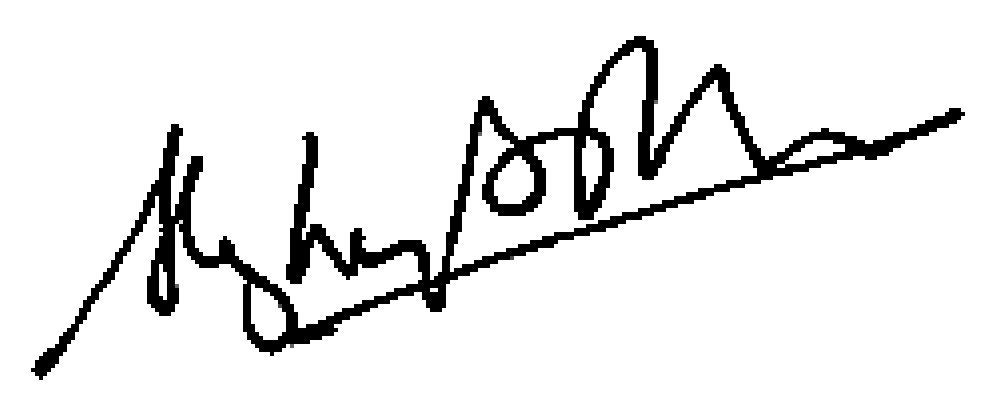
- Signature

Stephen Shawn Poloz OC (born 1955) is a Canadian banker who served as the ninth governor of the Bank of Canada from 2013 to 2020. He is also a member of the board of directors for the Bank for International Settlements.

== Background ==
Poloz was born in Oshawa, the son of a mould maker. His father is of Ukrainian and Polish descent, and his mother is of English and Scottish ancestry, and a relative of George Stephen, 1st Baron Mount Stephen. Poloz holds a Bachelor of Arts degree in economics from Queen's University and Master of Arts and Doctor of Philosophy degrees in economics from the University of Western Ontario. He is also a graduate of Columbia University's senior executive program and is a Certified International Trade Professional. His doctoral thesis was on currency movements.

== Education ==
Stephen Poloz received his bachelor's degree in 1978 from the Queen's University at Kingston, Canada. He majored in economics. He received his master's degree in economics in 1979 from the University of Western Ontario, and then a PhD in economics in 1982 from the same institution.

In 2017, Trent University Durham GTA awarded Poloz an honorary doctorate.

== Career ==
From 1981 to 1994 Poloz worked for the Bank of Canada, before leaving as chief of the research department to become managing editor of BCA Research from 1994 to 1999. Poloz joined Export Development Canada in 1999 and became its president and CEO in 2010. He has been a visiting scholar with the "Economic Planning Agency" in Tokyo and at the International Monetary Fund in Washington, DC.

Poloz attended the 62nd Bilderberg Annual Conference in Copenhagen, Denmark, in 2014, where one of the subjects discussed was the situation in Ukraine.

Poloz holds an honorary Certified International Trade Professional (CITP) designation from the Forum for International Trade Training. He is a past president of the Ottawa Economics Association.

=== Governor of the Bank of Canada ===
In 2013, Poloz was appointed as the Governor of the Bank of Canada on a seven-year term.

In January 2015, Poloz cut the Bank of Canada's key interest rate from 1 percent to 0.75 percent in response to a stark decline in oil prices. In July of that year, he cut the Bank's interest rate again to 0.5 percent. In July 2017, Poloz raised the Bank's key interest rate to 0.75 percent, the first interest rate increase in Canada in seven years. This marked the start of a series of five rate hikes in total; by October 2018, the Bank's key interest rate was at 1.75 percent. Throughout March 2020, Poloz reduced the Bank's interest rate from 1.75 percent to 0.25 percent in response to the economic downturn from the COVID-19 pandemic and a stark decline in oil prices.

In December 2019, the Bank of Canada announced Poloz would not seek a second term. His term as Governor expired in June 2020.

=== Post-governorship ===
After his term as governor, Poloz joined the board of directors of Enbridge. On August 1, 2020, Poloz joined the Toronto based law firm Osler, Hoskin & Harcourt as a special advisor to the firm. On July 1, 2022, Poloz joined the board of governors of Western University. He was appointed to the Order of Canada in 2024. In 2024, Poloz published his first book, The Next Age of Uncertainty, which explores economic challenges and global trends in the post-pandemic world.

== Personal life ==
Poloz is married to Valerie Poloz and they have two children. He currently lives in Orleans, Ontario.
