= Management accounting principles =

Management accounting case

Management accounting principles (MAP) were developed to serve the core needs of internal management to improve decision support objectives, internal business processes, resource application, customer value, and capacity utilization needed to achieve corporate goals in an optimal manner. Another term often used for management accounting principles for these purposes is managerial costing principles. The two management accounting principles are:

1. Principle of Causality (i.e., the need for cause and effect insights) and,
2. Principle of Analogy (i.e., the application of causal insights by management in their activities).

These two principles serve the management accounting community and its customers – the management of businesses. The above principles are incorporated into the Managerial Costing Conceptual Framework (MCCF) along with concepts and constraints to help govern the management accounting practice. The framework ends decades of confusion surrounding management accounting approaches, tools and techniques and their capabilities.

The framework of principles, concepts, and constraints will drive the classification of management accounting practices in the profession to "enable a better understanding both inside the profession and outside, of the compromises that result from inappropriate principles". Without foundational principles, managers and accounting professionals have no consistent footing on which to challenge or evaluate new theories of methods for managerial costing.

Some management accounting methods are designed primarily to serve and comply with financial accountancy guidelines. The importance of having distinct and separate principles exclusively for Management Accounting has received support and acknowledgement after almost a century of work on the topic. The idea that separate management accounting principles exist for managerial decision support distinct from financial reporting needs is now recognized by professional accounting bodies such as the International Federation of Accountants Professional Accountants In Business Committee and the Institute of Management Accountants Managerial Costing Conceptual Framework (MCCF) Task Force.

== Brief history ==
Prior to 1929 no group – public or private – was issuing or responsible for any accounting standards. After the 1929 stock market crash, a call to regain the public's confidence and investor's trust was demanded and the Securities and Exchange Act of 1934 was passed resulting in public companies being supervised by the U.S. Securities and Exchange Commission (SEC). This set the groundwork for GAAP Generally Accepted Accounting Principles (United States), outlining financial accounting principles for external reporting standards for users of financial statements' information such as capital markets and creditors.

Over the next 47 years many individual committees, professional bodies and boards released various financial accounting procedural frameworks until 1976 when work began on a US framework that remains in place today, governed by the Financial Accounting Standards Board (FASB).
Note: Since April 1, 2001 the International Accounting Standards Board has been working on developing new international financial reporting standards. The new standards, referred to as International Financial Reporting Standards (IFRS), aim to update and refine existing concepts and provide descriptive guidance that includes comparisons of reporting requirements between IFRS and U.S. GAAP. As a result of establishing International Financial Reporting Standards, the IASB and FASB Conceptual Frameworks and Standards are in the process of being updated and converged to reflect the changes in markets, business practices and the economic environment that have occurred in the two or more decades since the concepts were first developed. One of the foundations of a set of Financial Accounting Standards is the creation of a Conceptual Framework that defines the principles upon which the standards will be based. Most major national and international accounting standards have developed conceptual frameworks to support their work on setting standards.

In contrast, management accounting principles have been overlooked from both a conceptual and a standards point of view and, for the most part, overshadowed by financial accounting standards. Generally accepted accounting principles applies strictly to financial accounting because it was either the only guidance they had at the time, or did not know what else to do.

Until recently, no serious work has been done by the accounting profession on the conceptual differences between the use of management accounting techniques to support GAAP financial reporting and management accounting techniques used for internal decision support. This greatly compromises the management accounting practice and the ability of management accountants to provide managers with relevant decision support and optimization information. Yet, several innovative thinkers, shown in the Timeline below, saw value in management accounting having its own distinct set of principles. Over the last century it is more and more evident that management accounting principles be viewed as "indispensable to the evaluation and improvement of MA methods and practices" (Clinton, Van der Merwe 2012).

== Historical timeline ==
1910 – Church. The History of Accounting. The management accounting practice was originally discussed in a series of articles published in The Engineering Magazine. As was typical of early management accounting practice after the industrial revolution, it was a topic of interest to engineers. Church discussed practices that conveyed the management accounting principles of causality and analogy but never formally defined them. The content of this series was reprinted in The History of Accounting Journal in 1976.

1923 – John Maurice Clark. Studies in the Economics of Overhead Costs. Management Accounting theory developed and was embedded in his cost allocation discussion; Clark stressed the need to consider causes and their effects. He was also the first to delineate operational cost concepts from decision cost concepts having introduced the concept of avoidability.

1936 to 1954 – Committee on Cost Accounting Concepts and Standards (CACS). Operating under the direction of the American Accounting Association, CACS had determined to develop accounting principles and standards for all fields of accounting.

1954 – Benninger. The Accounting Review . "The principles accepted would not need to be restrictive, except in the sense that any proper practice restricts departure from it. They should deal more with fundamental methods of expressing accounting facts than with the extent of "disclosures" in published statements." and "… the cost accountant could be more effective the further his basic data were from the general ledger."

1979 – Shillinglaw. Cost Accounting Principles for External Reporting: A Conceptual Framework. "A body of concepts, principles, and practices has evolved over the years, gradually becoming what might be referred to as generally accepted cost accounting principles (1979, 157-158)." (Note: Shillinglaw's proposed principles were only considered for the select area of Cost Accounting – one offshoot of management accounting to serve external financial accounting specifically. His framework's stated intent was not to cater for Management Accounting per se but it nevertheless argued for causality as a principle.)

1983 – Choudhury. Accounting and Business Research. In discussing the confusion surrounding the lack of common and meaningful management accounting terminology says, "… we are no nearer to being provided with a coherent theory of, if you like, a conceptual framework for management accounting." Choudhury did not; however, propose a management accounting conceptual framework.

2002 – Richardson. Accounting Historians Journal. Alan Richardson documents five reasons why managerial accounting has been dominated by financial accounting:

1. the use of financial accounting criteria to judge the quality of management accounting systems,
2. the assignment of management accountants to subordinate positions in organizational units whose primary purpose was financial accounting,
3. the dominance of financial accounting in the market for educational materials,
4. the judgment of the labor market that a financial accountant could replace a management accountant (but not vice versa) and,
5. the need for a young profession to gain and retain the support of established interests in society.

2005 - International Federation of Accountants, Professional Accountants in Business Committee. Information Paper: The Roles And Domain of the Professional Accountant in Business . Under the Standards and Guidance section it states, "The purpose of principles-based good practice guidance is to encourage effective and efficient decision-making and the adoption of tools and techniques that can be applied intelligently within different types of organizations. Principles-based good practice guidance focuses on performance by addressing the value-creating processes and procedures that support robust business outcomes and successful organizations."

2007 – Van der Merwe. Cost Management Journal. The Management Accounting Philosophy series of articles. This series relied heavily on Shillinglaw's work with one exception. It added a philosophical foundation by using the basic Epistemology of Deductive reasoning and Inductive reasoning and two of the four laws of logic to show that management accounting's two principles are causality and analogy and that they are rooted in a bedrock of truth.

2009 – International Federation of Accountants, Professional Accountants in Business Committee. International Good Practice Guidance: Evaluation and Improving Costing in Organizations. The principles as proposed in the Management Accounting Philosophy series (referenced above; 2007) were adopted in IFAC's International Good Practice Guidance (IGPG).

2009 – International Federation of Accountants, Professional Accountants in Business Committee. Information Paper: Evaluating the Costing Journey: A Costing Levels Continuum Maturity Model . The maturity model was published as supplementary to the principles-based IGPG (referenced above) to allow companies to assess where they were on the proposed costing continuum as far as their management accounting maturity is concerned. Resource Consumption Accounting (RCA) was found to be the most advanced method available today.

2011 – Institute of Management Accountants. Strategic Finance Journal . In the October 2011 issue, an article titled Why We Need a Conceptual Framework for Managerial Costing provides a brief overview of the reasons why management accounting needs its own framework distinctly separate for internal managers.

2012 – Institute of Management Accountants, Managerial Costing Conceptual Framework Task Force. Conceptual Framework for Managerial Costing . An Exposure Draft was released July 2012 for public comment and is the most extensive and thorough guidance available to management accounting practitioners and users of management accounting information.

2014 – Chartered Institute of Management Accountants, American Institute of Certified Public Accountants. Global Management Accounting Principles (GMAPs). Two of the world's foremost accountancy bodies combined to create a new set of principles to guide best practice.

== Importance and objectives ==
Management accounting for use inside an organization must reflect the reality of the operations and resources used by the organization in monetary terms. Unlike financial reporting, where the objective focuses on external investors and creditors seek to compare investment options across the capital markets, management accounting focuses on the economic choices and constraints within an organization. There are two interrelated parts in understanding why management accounting principles are so important and how these principles help managers achieve their primary objective: enterprise optimization.

The first principal part deals with the actual modeling of a company's operations, where the management accountant establishes and builds causal relationships based on the principle of causality and related management accounting concepts. Part two involves the principle of analogy and the manager's analytical needs for decision support information provided by part one (its cause-and-effect relationships). Part two requires analyzing the information in light of one or more decision alternatives so that the decision maker(s) can reach the optimum decision. The cumulative application of both principles (causality and analogy) achieves management accounting's objectives and fulfills the managers' needs – the optimization of the company's operations, generally referred to as enterprise optimization.

First objective - managerial costing is:

- To provide a monetary reflection of the provision and utilization of business resources and,
- To provide cause and effect insights into past, present, or future enterprise economic activities.

Second objective – managerial costing aids managers:

- In their planning, analysis, and decision making and,
- Supports optimizing the achievement of an enterprise's strategic objectives.

At a more granular level the consistent application of management accounting's principles hold a number of benefits for an organization.

- Provide managers and employees with an accurate, objective cost model of the organization and cost information that reflects the use of the organization's resources.
- Present decision support information in a flexible mold that caters to the timeline and insights needed for internal decision makers.
- Provide decision makers insight into the marginal/incremental aspects of the alternatives they are considering.
- Model quantitative cause and effect linkages between outputs and the inputs required to produce and deliver final outputs.
- Accurately values all operations (support and production) of an entity (i.e. the supply and consumption of resources) in monetary terms.
- Provides information that aids in immediate and future economic decision making for optimization, growth, and/or attainment of enterprise strategic objectives.
- Provides information to evaluate performance and learn from results.
- Provides the basis and baseline factors for exploratory and predictive managerial activities

== Truth as the foundation ==
It is managerial accountants' job to provide correct information to all internal managers. In other words, the costing information gathered must be factual and truthful, as in 'what is the cost that reflects the actual use of the resources and processes'. Therefore, truth corresponds to facts and when applied to Management Accounting it translates to resources in operation creates a factual situation. Obviously, the resources and operations about which a manager makes decisions on are based on factual information. The manager's decision will act to change the current situation since the manager is interested in the economic impact of the possible outcomes.

Philip Lawton, investment professional and co-author of The Top Ten Operational Risks: A Survival Guide for Investment Management Firms and Hedge Funds writes

"Managerial costing is not to be confused with cost accounting. The latter (cost accounting) applies financial reporting conventions to inventory valuation, transfer pricing, and the cost of goods and services sold, and it serves the informational requirements of external parties, including investors, creditors, regulators, and tax authorities. Managerial costing is intended for internal use; it supports the decisions that managers make to optimize operations. The authors observe, "The stock market clearly does not value a company for excellently prepared financial statements if operational excellence is lacking." Moreover, in order to capture outputs and their required inputs, well-executed managerial costing uses data drawn from operational and logistical systems rather than general ledger accounts. In this way, operational quantities and costs are tied to the organization's internal value chain."

The Correspondence theory of truth was originally defined by Aristotle; however, a simpler and more up-to-date definition is: "A statement or opinion is true if what it corresponds to is a fact." The correspondence definition of truth forms the foundational building blocks for management accounting's principles. In this regard, the foundation of MAP is grounded in the laws of logic and structured reasoning outlined and discussed at length in the Management Accounting Philosophy series published in Cost Management. The recognition of truth as the basis for management accounting goes back a long way.

"It is very important that costs should not be regarded as something that may be manipulated, nor should they be thought of as representing anything but the cold truth, however unwelcome that may be."

— Church, 1910

This emphasis on truth should not be confused with precision; it should be clear that costing methods are disputable, while principles are not. Principles support managers who are required to make inferences about future outcomes of all the decision alternatives they are considering based on cause and effect insights. The use of principles enables managers to deal with causes and their effects in different time frames. This is not to say that management accounting is a science, it is not. But Decision science —that which management accounting supports, with the information it provides — is a science: 119. ;

"In order to provide a sound basis for decisions, cost measurements should, in so far as possible, reflect the truth".

— Benninger, 1954

The growth of management accounting and its practices as outlined in Management Accounting – Approaches, Techniques and Management Processes, mentions that management accountants remain dissatisfied with the quality of their management accounting information in the absence of guiding principles. This disconnect is clearly documented in research such as the 2003 Survey of Management Accounting by Ernst & Young LLP; co-sponsored by IMA and the follow-up survey 2012 Alta Via, SAP, and IMA Management Accounting Survey: A Replication and Longitudinal Comparison. Confusion and frustration took hold of the MA profession partly because accountants were trying to satisfy two very different goals with one information system; the compliance needs of financial reporting (GAAP) alongside managerial costing decision analysis needs. In addition, controllers, accountants, and managers who were seeking to improve operations or resolve internal costing issues discovered that when selecting different costing methods, each one subscribes to assorted allocation techniques and produces very different results. And finally, the lack of a conceptual framework and foundational principles that previously did not exist in order to do costing for internal decision support.

Contradicting theories and practices do not instill trust or truth towards the optimization of an entity. Foundational principles are intended to drive the classification of approaches, tools, and processes, thereby providing a way for accountants and managers to evaluate the tools and approaches they may be considering for the decision or costing tasks at hand. The principles function as a way of better understanding the risks and compromises associated with a practice or method when it strays from the principles of causality and analogy.

== Not GAAP ==
Companies need to identify the economic reality of their organization based on resources and operations, not reflect dollar values calculated using accrual-based accounting methods that conform to Generally Accepted Accounting Principles (United States). Accountants may argue that financial accounting principles represent true values and are more than sufficient for management accounting purposes. Maximizing financial statement results is a primary objective; however, focusing only on accounting numbers or common financial ratios can lead to bad behavior versus focusing on operations and resource use for long term sustainable economic success. By examining two of the four financial accounting principles, it will reveal that financial accounting principles (e.g., Historical cost, Revenue recognition, Matching principle, and Full Disclosure) do not serve the objectives of management accounting. Let's examine the following two GAAP principles:

a) Historical cost principle (Kieso, Weygandt and Warfield)p38 – the only time this principle reflects cost is at the initial time of purchase or acquisition. In subsequent periods, the historical cost along with taxation-driven depreciation methods does not help managers determine their current operational cost factors.

b) Matching principle (Kieso, Weygandt and Warfield)p40 – this principle mandates that the costs (expenses) must follow revenues or adopt the best "rational and systematic" allocation of costs associated with the benefit, including assumptions about when the benefit (and therefore costs) are to be received. Clearly, managers who are required to perform a cost analysis would have no idea under the matching principle what costs would be included/excluded or be currently impacting his department.

The two financial accounting principles noted above briefly describes the chasm that exists between financial accounting and managerial accounting objectives. Financial accounting's objective is to produce a coherent set of standards for consistency and comparability purposes; therefore, providing external parties in the capital markets, a level playing field for evaluating a company's individual performance as well as across other competing businesses. Where Management accounting's objectives exist is to inform internal managers of the correct choices for long term economic success.

As discussed with Larry R. White, task force member of the Managerial Costing Conceptual Framework, in CFO.com,

"Manufacturing companies, in particular, often run into problems from the use of GAAP models for internal costing purposes, White notes. "We've seen factories where salesmen line up to get their orders run by the oldest production line in the factory, while there are brand-new production lines and machines sitting idle that would produce the order quicker and with better quality. The reason is that the factory was doing its costing based on a derivation of GAAP standards. Consequently, the fully depreciated machines didn't have a depreciation charge associated with them, where the newer machinery did."

== Concepts and Constraints ==
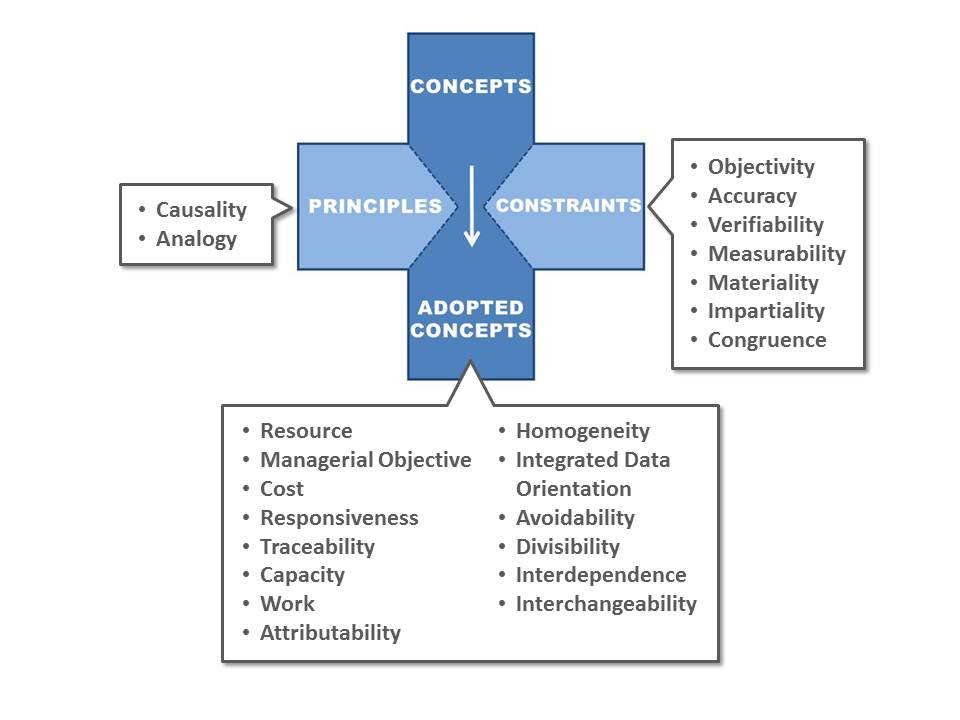
Diagram of Principles, Concepts, and Constraints specific to the field of Management Accounting and its internal business users.

=== Principles ===
Management accountants can rely on causality and analogy as foundational principles as they are grounded in decision science – the laws of logic.

- Causality principle — the relation between a managerial objective's quantitative output and the input quantities that must be, or must have been, consumed if the output is to be achieved.

Principle of Causality enables modeling the organization's costs based on the relationship between the inputs and outputs of the resources involved in the production of products and services it provides. Often this is straightforward when dealing with strong causal relationships (i.e. raw materials to make product A). However, where weaker causal relationships exist, costs need to be attributed according to the concept of attributability, which maintains the integrity of causality.

- Analogy principle — the use of causal insights to infer past or future outcomes.

Principle of Analogy governs the user of management accounting information's ability to apply the knowledge or insights gained from the causal relationships modeled (e.g., in planning, control, what-if analysis) using inductive and deductive reasoning about past and future outcomes for continuous optimization efforts.

=== Concepts ===
The following concepts serve as operational guidelines and modeling building blocks to the two main principles (causality and analogy) in developing a reflective cause & effect model and then using the information the model provides. These concepts are intended to cover a variety of assumptions that would make up a model, their characteristics, and relationships and to provide rational perspectives when modeling many managerial costing issues.

The first ten concepts support the Principle of Causality the modeling of Cause&Effect-based modeling principles, while the remaining four concepts are applicable to the Principle of Analogy and informational in nature and supports managers with decision making guidelines.

Concepts applicable to causality and modeling:

- Attributability
- Capacity
- Cost
- Homogeneity
- Integrated data orientation
- Managerial objective
- Resource
- Responsiveness
- Traceability
- Work

Concepts applicable to analogy and information use:

- Avoidability
- Divisibility
- Interdependence
- Interchangeability

=== Constraints ===
The following constraints have been identified for management accounting. The quantitative and qualitative characteristics of these constraints are meant to serve as controls or checks and balances when constructing a cost model or when using management accounting information. The first five constraints are specific to Causality in the cost model, while the remaining two constraints deal with Analogy and the use of the information.

Constraints applicable to causality:

- Materiality
- Measurability
- Objectivity
- Verifiability

Constraints applicable to analogy information use:

- Congruence
- Impartiality

== See also ==
- Convention of consistency
