= Certified in Financial Forensics =

Certified in Financial Forensics (CFF) is a specialty credential in financial forensics issued in the United States by the American Institute of Certified Public Accountants (AICPA). In Canada, the CFF credential is granted by the Chartered Professional Accountants of Canada (CPA Canada).

== History ==
The CFF credential was established in 2008 to designate expertise in forensic accounting. The program objectives included enhancing the quality of forensic services and increasing public awareness of the CFF designation.

== Knowledge ==
To obtain the credential an individual needs to complete both fundamental and specialized knowledge training.

- The fundamental knowledge includes, Laws, Courts and Dispute Resolution, Planning and Preparation, Information Gathering and Preserving, Discovery, and Reporting, Experts and Testimony.
- The specialized, includes Bankruptcy, insolvency and reorganization, Valuation, Economic damage calculations, Family Law, Financial Statement Misrepresentations, Fraud prevention, detection and response, and Computer forensic analysis which includes Data integrity - Data imaging, Data recovery, and Cyber crime.

== Eligibility ==
To obtain the CFF credential, the applicant must:

- Hold a Certified Public Accountant (CPA) license;
- Pass the CFF examination;
- Demonstrate in excess of 1,000 hours of experience doing forensic accounting work;
- Complete 75 hours of continuing professional education (CPE) related to forensic accounting.

After obtaining the CFF credential, the CPA must continue to earn at least 20 hours of financial forensics-related CPE per year to maintain the CFF credential.
