= Patterson School of Accountancy =

Accounting school at University of Mississippi

Coordinates: 34.36630°N 89.53657°W

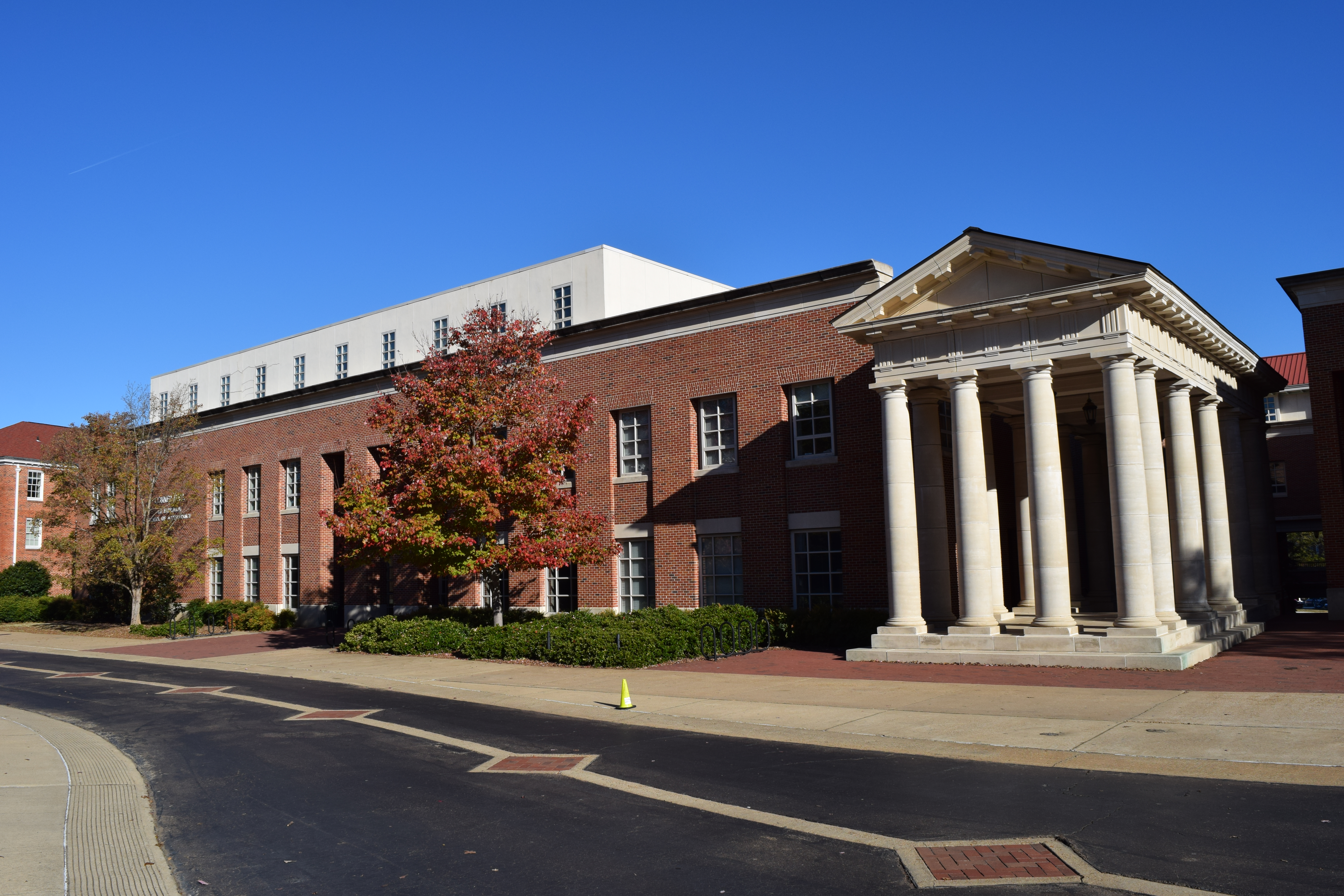
Conner Hall, the home of the Patterson School of Accountancy, in 2018

The Patterson School of Accountancy is the school of accounting located at the University of Mississippi in the city of Oxford, Mississippi, United States. The school, previously a part of the university's School of Business Administration, was formed as an independent entity in 1979, and offers degrees in accountancy.

== History ==
The university first announced that the Department of Accountancy would split from the School of Business Administration in the summer of 1978, to "accommodate a growing number of students who wish to be accountants and to meet the needs of an expanding profession," as the Scott County Times wrote.

The university named the school after alumnus E.F. "Pat" Patterson, an executive vice president and chief financial officer of the Donrey Media Group, in 1997.

In 2024, Jonathan B. Jones, chief executive officer of Jones Capital, donated $10 million to go towards a new Patterson School of Accountancy facility, Jones Hall. Construction of the new facility is slated for summer 2026.
