= Statements on Auditing Standards (United States) =

Guidelines for financial audits

In the United States, Statements on Auditing Standards provide guidance to external auditors on generally accepted auditing standards (abbreviated as GAAS) in regards to auditing a non-public company and issuing a report. They are promulgated by the Auditing Standards Board of the American Institute of Certified Public Accountants (AICPA), which holds all copyright on the Standards. They are commonly abbreviated as "SAS" followed by their respective number and title.

With the permission of the AICPA, the full text of Standards 1–101 has been posted on the website of the Digital Accounting Collection at the J.D. Williams Library of the University of Mississippi. Links to these full-text records appear in the List of Statements of Auditing Standards below.

== List of Statements of Auditing Standards ==
=== Pre-clarified Statements on Auditing Standards ===
No.	Official title	Issued on
1	Codification of Auditing Standards and Procedures full-text	November 1972
2	Reports on Audited Financial Statements full-text	October 1974
3	The Effects of EDP on the Auditor's Study and Evaluation of Internal Control full-text	December 1974
4	Quality Control Considerations for a Firm of Independent Auditors full-text	December 1974
5	The Meaning of "Present Fairly in Conformity With Generally Accepted Accounting Principles" in the Independent Auditor's Report full-text	July 1975
6	Related Party Transactions full-text	July 1975
7	Communications Between the Predecessor and Successor Auditors full-text	October 1975
8	Other Information in Documents Containing Audited Financial Statements full-text	December 1975
9	The Effect of an Internal Audit Function on the Scope of the Independent Auditor's Examination full-text	December 1975
10	Limited Review of Interim Financial Information full-text	December 1975
11	Using the Work of a Specialist full-text	December 1975
12	Inquiry of a Client's Lawyer Concerning Litigation, Claims, and Assessments full-text	January 1976
13	Reports on a Limited Review of Interim Financial Information full-text	May 1976
14	Special Reports full-text	December 1976
15	Reports on Comparative Financial Statements full-text	December 1976
16	The Independent Auditor's Responsibility full-text	January 1977
17	Illegal Acts by Clients full-text	January 1977
18	Unaudited Replacement Cost-Information full-text	May 1977
19	Client Representations full-text	June 1977
20	Required Communication of Material Weaknesses in Internal Accounting Control full-text	August 1977
21	Segment Information full-text	December 1977
22	Planning and Supervision full-text	March 1978
23	Analytical Review Procedures full-text	October 1978
24	Review of Interim Financial Information full-text	March 1979
25	The Relationship of Generally Accepted Auditing Standards to Quality Control Standards full-text	November 1979
26	Association with Financial Statements full-text	November 1979
27	Supplementary Information Required by the Financial Accounting Standards Board full-text	December 1979
28	Supplementary Information on the Effects of Changing Prices full-text	June 1980
29	Reporting on Information Accompanying the Basic Financial Statements in Auditor-Submitted Documents full-text	July 1980
30	Reporting on Internal Accounting Control full-text	July 1980
31	Evidential Matter full-text	August 1980
32	Adequacy of Disclosure of Financial Statements full-text	October 1980
33	Supplementary Oil and Gas Reserve Information full-text	October 1980
34	The Auditor's Considerations When a Question Arises About and Entity's Continued Existence full-text	March 1981
35	Special Reports-Applying Agreed-Upon Procedures to Specified Elements, Accounts, or Items of a Financial Statement full-text	April 1981
36	Review of Interim Financial Information full-text	April 1981
37	Filings Under Federal Securities Statutes full-text	April 1981
38	Letters for Underwriters full-text	April 1981
39	Audit Sampling full-text	June 1981
40	Supplementary Mineral Reserve Information full-text	February 1982
41	Working Papers full-text	April 1982
42	Reporting on Condensed Financial Statements and Selected Financial Data full-text	September 1982
43	Omnibus Statement on Auditing Standards full-text	August 1982
44	Special-Purpose Reports on Internal Accounting Control at Service Organizations full-text	December 1982
45	Omnibus Statement on Auditing Standards-1983 full-text	August 1983
46	Consideration of Omitted Procedures After the Report Date full-text	September 1983
47	Audit Risk and Materiality in Conducting an Audit full-text	December 1983
48	The Effects of Computer Processing on the Audit of Financial Statements full-text	July 1984
49	Letters for Underwriters full-text	September 1984
50	Reports on the Application of Accounting Principles full-text	July 1986
51	Reporting on Financial Statements Prepared for Use in Other Countries full-text	July 1986
52	Omnibus Statement on Auditing Standards-1987 full-text	April 1988
53	The Auditor's Responsibility to Detect and Report Errors and Irregularities full-text	April 1988
54	Illegal Acts by Clients full-text	April 1988
55	Consideration of Internal Control in a Financial Statement Audit full-text	April 1988
56	Analytical Procedures full-text	April 1988
57	Auditing Accounting Estimates full-text	April 1988
58	Reports on Audited Financial Statements full-text	April 1988
59	The Auditor's Consideration of an Entity's Ability to Continue as a Going Concern full-text	April 1988
60	Communication of Internal Control Related Matters Noted in an Audit full-text	April 1988
61	Communication With Audit Committees full-text	April 1988
62	Special Reports full-text	April 1989
63	Compliance Auditing Applicable to Governmental Entities and Other Recipients of Governmental Financial Assistance full-text	April 1989
64	Omnibus Statement on Auditing Standards-1990 full-text	December 1990
65	The Auditor's Consideration of the Internal Audit Function in an Audit of Financial Statements full-text	April 1991
66	Communication of Matters About Interim Financial Information Filed or to Be Filed with Special Regulatory Agencies-An Amendment to SAS No. 36: Review of Interim Financial Information full-text	June 1991
67	The Confirmation Process full-text	November 1991
68	Compliance Auditing Considerations in Audits of Governmental Financial Assistance full-text	December 1991
69	The Meaning of "Present Fairly in Conformity With Generally Accepted Accounting Principles" full-text	January 1992
70	Service Organizations full-text	April 1992
71	Interim Financial Information full-text	May 1992
72	Letters for Underwriters and Certain Other Requesting Parties full-text	February 1993
73	Using the Work of a Specialist full-text	July 1994
74	Compliance Auditing Considerations in Audits of Governmental Financial Assistance full-text	February 1995
75	Engagements to Apply Agreed-Upon Procedures to Specified Elements, Accounts, or Items of a Financial Statement full-text	September 1995
76	Amendments to Statements on Auditing Standards No. 72: Letters for Underwriters and Certain Other Requesting Parties full-text	September 1995
77	Amendments to Statements on Auditing Standards No. 22: Planning and Supervision, No. 59: The Auditor's Consideration of an Entity's Ability to Continue as a Going Concern, and No. 62: Special Reports full-text	November 1995
78	Consideration of Internal Control in a Financial Statement Audit: An Amendment to Statement on Auditing Standards No. 55 full-text	December 1995
79	Amendment to Statement on Auditing Standards No. 58: Reports on Audited Financial Statements full-text	December 1995
80	Amendment to Statement on Auditing Standards No. 31: Evidential Matter full-text	December 1996
81	Auditing Investments full-text	December 1996
82	Consideration of Fraud in a Financial Statement Audit full-text	February 1997
83	Establishing an Understanding With the Client full-text	October 1997
84	Communications Between the Predecessor and Successor Auditors full-text	October 1997
85	Management Representations full-text	November 1997
86	Amendments to Statements on Auditing Standards No. 72: Letters for Underwriters and Certain Other Requesting Parties full-text	March 1998
87	Restricting the Use of the Auditor's Report full-text	September 1998
88	Service Organizations and Reporting on Consistency full-text	December 1999
89	Audit Adjustments full-text	December 1999
90	Audit Committee Communications full-text	December 1999
91	Federal GAAP Hierarchy full-text	April 2000
92	Auditing Derivative Instruments, Hedging Activities, and Investments in Securities full-text	September 2000
93	Omnibus Statement on Auditing Standards-2000 full-text	October 2000
94	The Effect of Information Technology on the Auditor's Consideration of Internal Control in a Financial Statement Audit full-text	May 2001
95	Generally Accepted Auditing Standards full-text	December 2001
96	Audit Documentation full-text	January 2002
97	Amendment to Statement on Auditing Standards No. 50: Reports on the Application of Accounting Principles full-text	June 2002
98	Omnibus Statement on Auditing Standards-2002 full-text	September 2002
99	Consideration of Fraud in a Financial Statement Audit full-text	October 2002
100	Interim Financial Information full-text	November 2002
101	Auditing Fair Value Measurements and Disclosures full-text	January 2003
102	Defining Professional Requirements in Statements on Auditing Standards full-text	December 2005
103	Audit Documentation full-text	December 2005
104	Amendment to Statement on Auditing Standards No. 1: Codification of Auditing Standards and Procedures (Due Professional Care in the Performance of Work) full-text	February 2006
105	Amendment to Statement on Auditing Standards No. 95: Generally Accepted Auditing Standards full-text	February 2006
106	Audit Evidence full-text	February 2006
107	Audit Risk and Materiality in Conducting an Audit full-text	February 2006
108	Planning and Supervision full-text	February 2006
109	Understanding the Entity and its Environment and Assessing the Risks of Material Misstatements full-text	February 2006
110	Performing Audit Procedures in Response to Assessed Risks and Evaluating the Audit Evidence Obtained full-text	February 2006
111	Amendment to Statement on Auditing Standards No. 39: Audit Sampling full-text	February 2006
112	Communicating Internal Control Related Matters Identified in an Audit full-text	May 2006
113	Omnibus 2006 full-text	November 2006
114	The Auditor's Communication With Those Charged With Governance full-text	December 2006
115	Communicating Internal Control Related Matters Identified in an Audit full-text	October 2008
116	Interim Financial Information full-text	February 2009
117	Compliance Audits full-text	December 2009
118	Other Information in Documents Containing Audited Financial Statements	February 2010
119	Supplementary Information in Relation to the Financial Statements as a Whole	February 2010
120	Required Supplementary Information	February 2010
121	Revised applicability of statement on auditing standards no. 100, Interim financial information	February 2011

=== Clarified Statements on Auditing Standards ===
SAS No. 122, Clarification and Recodification, contains the Preface to Codification of Statements on Auditing Standards, Principles Underlying an Audit Conducted in Accordance With Generally Accepted Auditing Standards, and 39 clarified SASs. This statement recodifies and supersedes all outstanding SASs through No. 121 except

- SAS No. 51, Reporting on Financial Statements Prepared for Use in Other Countries;
- SAS No. 59, The Auditor's Consideration of an Entity's Ability to Continue as a Going Concern, as amended;
- SAS No. 65, The Auditor's Consideration of the Internal Audit Function in an Audit of Financial Statements;
- SAS No. 87, Restricting the Use of an Auditor's Report; and
- the following clarified SASs that were issued to address practice issues timely and are already effective:
  - SAS No. 117, Compliance Audits (issued December 2009);
  - SAS No. 118, Other Information in Documents Containing Audited Financial Statements (issued February 2010);
  - SAS No. 119, Supplementary Information in Relation to the Financial Statements as a Whole (issued February 2010); and
  - SAS No. 120, Required Supplementary Information (issued February 2010).

SAS No. 122 also withdraws SAS No. 26, Association With Financial Statements, as amended.

The AICPA is the source of the most up-to-date information.

No.	Official title	Issued on	Current status
122	Clarification and recodification	October 2011	In effect
123	Omnibus statement on auditing standards	October 2011	In effect
124	Financial statements prepared in accordance with a financial reporting framework generally accepted in another country	October 2011	In effect
125	Alert that restricts the use of the auditor's written communication	December 2011	In effect
126	Auditor's consideration of an entity's ability to continue as a going concern (redrafted)	July 2012	In effect
127	Omnibus statement on auditing standards - 2913	January 2013	In effect
128	Using the work of internal auditors	February 2014	In effect
129	Amendment to statement on auditing standards no. 122 section 920, Letters for underwriters and certain other requesting parties, as amended	July 2014	In effect
130	Audit of internal control over financial reporting that is integrated with an audit of financial statements	October 2015	In effect
131	Amendment to Statement on auditing standards no. 122, Section 700, Forming an opinion and reporting on financial statements	January 2016	In effect
132	The Auditor's Consideration of an Entity's Ability to Continue as a Going Concern	February 2017	In effect
133	Auditor Involvement With Exempt Offering Documents	July 2017	In effect
134	Auditor Reporting and Amendments, Including Amendments Addressing Disclosures in the Audit of Financial Statements	May 2019	In effect
135	Omnibus Statement on Auditing Standards—2019	May 2019	In effect
136	Forming an Opinion and Reporting on Financial Statements of Employee Benefit Plans Subject to ERISA	July 2019	In effect
137	The Auditor's Responsibilities Relating to Other Information Included in Annual Reports	July 2019	In effect
138	Amendments to the Description of the Concept of Materality	December 2019	In effect
139	Amendments to AU-C Sections 800, 805, and 810 to Incorporate Auditor Reporting Changes From SAS No. 134	March 2020	In effect
140	Amendments to AU-C Sections 725, 730, 930, 935, and 940 to Incorporate Auditor Reporting Changes From SAS Nos. 134 and 137	April 2020	In effect
141	Amendment to the Effective Dates of SAS Nos. 134–140	May 2020	In effect
142	Audit Evidence	July 2020	In effect
143	Auditing Accounting Estimates and Related Disclosures	July 2020	In effect
144	Amendments to AU-C Sections 501, 540, and 620 Related to the Use of Specialists and the Use of Pricing Information Obtained From External Information Sources	June 2021	In effect
145	Understanding the Entity and Its Environment and Assessing the Risks of Material Misstatement	October 2021	Effective for audits ending on or after December 15, 2023
146	Quality Management for an Engagement Conducted in Accordance With Generally Accepted Auditing Standards	June 2022	Effective for engagements conducted in accordance with GAAS for periods beginning on or after December 15, 2025

== Codification of Statements on Auditing Standards ==
The American Institute of Certified Public Accountants began codifying the Statements on Auditing standards semiannually in 1976. The Codification of Statements on Auditing Standards is generally issued in January, and the U.S. Auditing Standards is issued as part of the AICPA Professional Standards in June of each year. The current U.S. Auditing Standards are available at the AICPA's Web site. Below is a list of older codifications from the Professional Standards.

Date	Official title	Issued on
1976	AICPA Professional Standards: Auditing as of July 1, 1976 full-text	July 1, 1976
1977	AICPA Professional Standards: Auditing as of July 1, 1977 full-text	July 1, 1977
1978	AICPA Professional Standards: Auditing as of July 1, 1978 full-text	July 1, 1978
1979	AICPA Professional Standards: Auditing as of July 1, 1979 full-text	July 1, 1979
1980	AICPA Professional Standards: Auditing as of June 1, 1980 full-text	June 1, 1980
1981	AICPA Professional Standards: Auditing as of June 1, 1981 full-text	June 1, 1981
1982	AICPA Professional Standards: U.S. Auditing Standards as of June 1, 1982 full-text	June 1, 1982
1983	AICPA Professional Standards: U.S. Auditing Standards as of June 1, 1983 full-text	June 1, 1983
1984	AICPA Professional Standards: U.S. Auditing Standards as of June 1, 1984 full-text	June 1, 1984
1985	AICPA Professional Standards: U.S. Auditing Standards as of June 1, 1985 full-text	June 1, 1985
1986	AICPA Professional Standards: U.S. Auditing Standards as of June 1, 1986 full text	June 1, 1986
1987	AICPA Professional Standards: U.S. Auditing Standards as of June 1, 1987 full-text	June 1, 1987
1988	AICPA Professional Standards: U.S. Auditing Standards as of June 1, 1988 full-text	June 1, 1988
1989	AICPA Professional Standards: U.S. Auditing Standards as of June 1, 1989 full-text	June 1, 1989
1990	AICPA Professional Standards: U.S. Auditing Standards as of June 1, 1990 full-text	June 1, 1990
1991	AICPA Professional Standards: U.S. Auditing Standards as of June 1, 1991 full-text	June 1, 1991
1992	AICPA Professional Standards: U.S. Auditing Standards as of June 1, 1992 full-text	June 1, 1992
1993	AICPA Professional Standards: U.S. Auditing Standards as of June 1, 1993 full-text	June 1, 1993
1994	AICPA Professional Standards: U.S. Auditing Standards as of June 1, 1994 full-text	June 1, 1994
1995	AICPA Professional Standards: U.S. Auditing Standards as of June 1, 1995 full-text	June 1, 1995
1996	AICPA Professional Standards: U.S. Auditing Standards as of June 1, 1996 full-text	June 1, 1996
1997	AICPA Professional Standards: U.S. Auditing Standards as of June 1, 1997 full-text	June 1, 1997
1998	AICPA Professional Standards: U.S. Auditing Standards as of June 1, 1998 full-text	June 1, 1998
1999	AICPA Professional Standards: U.S. Auditing Standards as of June 1, 1999 full-text	June 1, 1999
2000	AICPA Professional Standards: U.S. Auditing Standards as of June 1, 2000 full-text	June 1, 2000
2001	AICPA Professional Standards: U.S. Auditing Standards as of June 1, 2001 full-text	June 1, 2001
2002	AICPA Professional Standards: U.S. Auditing Standards as of June 1, 2002 full-text	June 1, 2002
2003	AICPA Professional Standards: U.S. Auditing Standards as of June 1, 2003 full-text	June 1, 2003
2004	AICPA Professional Standards: U.S. Auditing Standards as of June 1, 2004 full-text	June 1, 2004
2005	AICPA Professional Standards: U.S. Auditing Standards as of June 1, 2005 full-text	June 1, 2005
2006	AICPA Professional Standards: U.S. Auditing Standards as of June 1, 2006 full-text	June 1, 2006
2007	AICPA Professional Standards: U.S. Auditing Standards as of June 1, 2007 full-text	June 1, 2007

== See also ==
- Auditing
- AICPA
- Statements of Financial Accounting Standards (USA)
- International Standards on Auditing
- Statements on auditing standards
