= National Association of Black Accountants =

U.S. professional organization

National Association of Black Accountants, Inc.
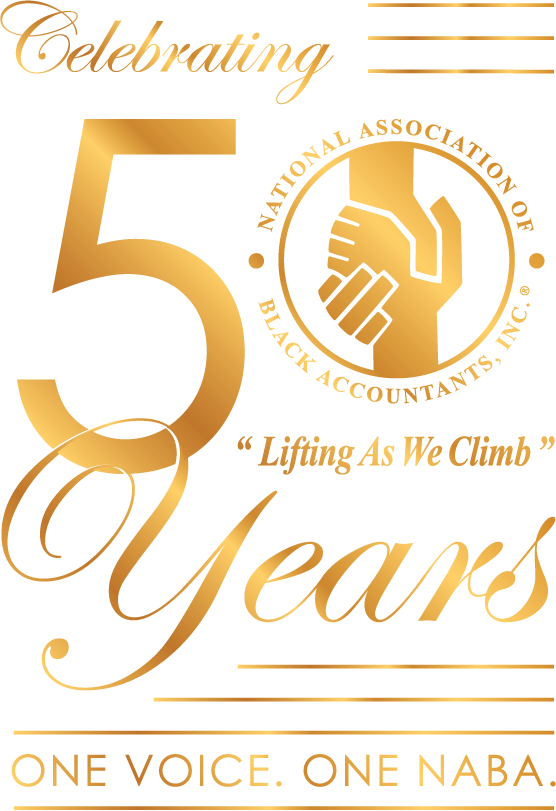
- Formation: 1969
- Type: Professional association
- Headquarters: Greenbelt, Maryland
- Location: United States
- President & CEO: Guylaine Saint Juste
- Chief Operating Officer: Catherine Foca
- Website: www.nabainc.org

The National Association of Black Accountants (NABA, Inc.), is an American nonprofit professional association that represents the interests of more than 200,000 black professionals in furthering their educational and professional goals in accounting, finance, and related business professions. Student members are served throughout the organization around the country.

The Association's national and local programs are designed to support the overall goals and objectives of the Association. These programs provide support to, and create opportunities for, professionals and students seeking levels of accomplishment in the fields of accounting and finance.

NABA's membership body includes entry and mid-level accountants, auditors and financial professional, senior-level managers and executives, firm partners, as well accounting, finance, business, and IT students. More than half of NABA's members work in corporate America, with the remainder serving in nonprofit, government, academic, and international arenas. Forty percent hold advanced degrees and 45% hold professional certifications. NABA is also made up of corporate members who represent hundreds of African American-owned CPA firms around the country.

== Membership ==
NABA offers two categories of membership:

- Professional members have completed their undergraduate studies and hold an accounting or finance-related designation (e.g., CPA, CMA, CFA, CIA, CGMA, etc.) or are engaged in a professional accounting or finance-related career.
- Student members are undergraduate or graduate students (full or part-time) majoring in accounting, finance, or a related field, or high-school students interested in pursuing a career in accounting or finance.

== Organizational structure ==
The association is a 501(c)(3) nonprofit membership organization. There are two classes of membership: student and professional. Professional members may also opt to obtain the Lifetime Member designation. The 160 student chapters are named by their college or university and fall under the auspices of the nearest of the 48 professional chapters. A National Board of Directors, which includes regional leaders, governs the entire organization. The headquarters is in Greenbelt, Maryland.

== History ==
NABA was established in 1969 by nine African American accountants in New York City. In 1969, there were 100,000 people who held the Certified Public Accountant (CPA) designation–only 150 of them were African American. That same year, the American Institute of Certified Public Accountants—the professional body that awards CPAs—passed a resolution on the lack of diversity in the accounting profession and established the Minority Initiative Committee. Today, through the efforts of NABA, the AICPA, and other interested groups, there are more than 200,000 African Americans participating in the field of accounting, of which more than 5,000 are CPAs.

Challenges of African Americans in Obtaining the CPA

Given the importance of the CPA designation in reaching top levels of the profession, NABA extends significant resources to help its members achieve this mark and to study the factors that impose barriers to obtaining it. In June 2007, NABA, along with Howard University's Center for Accounting Education, held the first CPA Examination Summit at NABA's Annual National Convention. The convening gathered participants from public accounting, industry, and academia to explore why—despite their increasing numbers in college degree programs—growing numbers of African Americans were not sitting for or passing the CPA examination.

The Summit unearthed a number of issues, including generational challenges, lack of black CPA role models, and exam mechanics. A second Summit in 2008 led to the creation of several programs within NABA and other organizations to resolve these issues, with financial support from accounting firms Ernst & Young and Deloitte.

== Programs and Initiatives ==
NABA's programs consist of professional development, networking opportunities, job placement, continuing education, technical training, national and regional conferences, and public service initiatives.

- CPA Bound grew out of NABA's President's Advisory Council to increase the number of African American CPAs. In concert with Howard University and Becker CPA Review, the program offers an intensive seven-week Boot Camp for young professionals preparing to sit for the CPA exam. CPA Bound also hosts the annual CPA Examination Summit to monitor progress of efforts to increase the number of minorities passing the exam.
- NABA's Accounting Career Awareness Program (ACAP) is an annual one-week residency program for high school students to be introduced accounting, finance, and general business concepts.
- For professional members, NABA provides continuing professional education credits (CPEs) through technical sessions held throughout the year and at the Annual National Convention. NABA is registered with the National Association of State Boards of Accountancy as an official sponsor of continuing professional education.
- NABA hosts a three-tiered Leadership Development Institute that helps participants bridge the gap from mid-to-senior-to executive levels of business leadership. The institutes take place in conjunction with NABA's Annual National Convention.
  - Executive Leadership Development Institute (ELDI): Participants must have a minimum of 12 years of experience and at least 5 years of senior level management experience. Sessions are designed for those aspiring to the move into executive leadership positions (e.g., a CPA firm partner, a C-Suite executive, financial services firm SVP, etc.).
  - Management Leadership Development Institute (MLDI): For participants with 7 to 11 years of experience and a minimum of 3 years of management experience. Sessions are designed to motivate and inspire participants to increase performance as individuals, manage teams, and strengthen their leadership competencies. This program equips mid-level managers with the tools that will enhance their ability to motivate others, streamline processes and influence colleagues to make the best business decisions.
  - Aspiring Leaders Development Institute (ALDI): For participants with 4 to 7 years of experience. Sessions are designed for those aspiring to the management level. It focuses on examining and discussing the challenges many managers face in their companies as they prepare their careers for growth.
- Student members of NABA have access to its National Scholarship Program, which has offered more than $11.2 million in support since beginning in 1987. The Distinguished Collegian Award is the organization's highest student honor and recognizes NABA students who are making a difference in their chapters and communities. The Student Case Study Competition is a rigorous challenge between student teams who research, develop, and prepare oral presentations that address accounting and business topics. The competition takes place each year at NABA's Annual National Convention.
- Community service is an important part of NABA membership. Each year, members take time away from the Annual National Convention and complete an outreach mission as part of NABA's Day of Service. It began when NABA's convention took place in New Orleans in 2009 and will continue in 2010 in Houston. Moreover, NABA professional members annually cosponsor IRS Volunteer Income Tax Assistance Program sites to help low-to-moderate income people prepare their tax returns.
- NABA partners with AICPA to bring comprehensive consumer financial literacy education to youth, students, and low-to-moderate income families.

== Conferences ==
Each year, the Association hosts five regional conferences in the fall for students. In addition to professional development sessions, students receive scholarships and apply for internships. Seniors are scheduled for onsite interviews for employment following graduation. Each June, NABA convenes the general membership for large-scale networking sessions and student development opportunities, leadership training, professional awards, student case competition, the NABA Day of Service, and scholarship awards. In 2020, NABA hosted its first virtual convention titled Insight Reimagined and began producing Spectrum Live, a weekly digital series for accounting and finance professionals.

== See also ==
- Accounting Firms Seek to Diversify Image, Washington Post
- Integration of Blacks in the Accounting Profession, The CPA Journal
- Expanding the Ranks of African-American CPAs, Journal of Accountancy
- Hammond, Theresa (2002). A White-Collar Profession: African American Certified Public Accountants since 1921. University of North Carolina Press. ISBN 0-8078-2708-8.
