= Certified information technology professional =

Certified Information Technology Professional (CITP) is a professional certification for professionals in the field of information technology (IT). The credential is given to Certified Practising Accountants (CPAs) only; however, professionals of varied qualifications may apply depending on the organization offering the certification.

Most firms that offer this certification require an unrevoked and valid CPA license. It is administered by the AICPA through the National Accreditation Commission via a volunteer committee and staff. The committee was formed in 2003 and initially chaired, through 2005, by Michael Dickson.

== Qualifications ==
In some firms, CITP is offered only to those who have completed a formal exam, which includes the five CITP Body of Knowledge areas:

- Risk Assessment
- Fraud Considerations
- Internal Controls & Information Technology General Controls
- Evaluate, Test and Report
- Information Management and Business Intelligence

In addition, certain certifications and advanced degrees also apply.

=== CITP Multiple Entry Point System (MEP) ===
To be awarded the CITP Credential, a CPA must accumulate 100 total points. On the CITP Credential Application, one will be asked to sign a Declaration and Intent to comply with all the requirements for CITP recertification. A percentage of CITP applications will be randomly selected for further review each year, and if selected, the applicant agrees to provide detailed documentation to support the assertions of the application. Total points will be earned based on business experience, lifelong learning, and, if required, the results of an examination. The business experience requirements are:

- The candidate must earn a minimum of 25 points within the five-year period preceding the date of application.
- 40 hours of IT-related business experience equals approximately 1 point.
- You must earn a minimum of 25 points in lifelong learning within the five-year period preceding the date of application.

The maximum number of business experience points that can be earned over the preceding five-year period is 60.
