= Auditing Standards Board =

Technical committee related to accounting in the United States

In the United States, the Auditing Standards Board (ASB) is the senior technical committee designated by the American Institute of Certified Public Accountants (AICPA) to issue auditing, attestation, and quality control statements, standards and guidance to certified public accountants (CPAs) for non-public company audits. Created in October 1978, it is composed of 19 members representing various industries and sectors, including public accountants and private, educational, and governmental entities. It issues pronouncements in the form of statements, interpretations, and guidelines, which all CPAs must adhere to when performing audits and attestations.

== History ==
=== Prior auditing standards and authorities ===
The American Institute of Certified Public Accountants has issued guidance to accountants and auditors since 1917, when, at the behest of the U.S. Federal Trade Commission and auspices of the Federal Reserve Board, it issued a series of pamphlets to the accounting community in regard to preparing financial statements and auditing (then referred to as "verification" and later "examination"). Verification of Financial Statements, the first pamphlet dedicated exclusively to providing guidance for audits, was issued in 1929. With its opening paragraph, the guidance provided one of the most fundamental principles in auditing, stating that "the responsibility for the extent of the (audit) work required must be assumed by the auditor." In 1936 the AICPA revised its prior pronouncements and issued Examination of Financial Statements by Independent Public Accountants, which contained more detailed guidance on performing audit procedures for audits of small and mid-sized companies, while still emphasizing the need to perform the audit based on the nature of the client, its size, and its internal control structure, among other attributes.

On January 30, 1939, the Committee on Auditing Procedure was formed by the AICPA to evaluate, discuss, and issue guidance exclusively on auditing-related matters. This Committee is considered the antecessor of the Auditing Standards Board, and was the first to issue Statements on auditing standards and principles to the public accounting community. In 1941 it issued a pamphlet titled Statements on Auditing Procedure, which discussed the auditor’s responsibility in applying judgment in audits. It was followed by a series of numbered pronouncements called Statements on Auditing Procedures, or SAP (the antecessors of Statements on Auditing Standards), issued between 1939 up to the early 1970s for a total of 54 SAP pronouncements. During that time, the Securities Exchange Commission required public accountants to include a representation in their independent audit reports that the audit was performed in compliance with generally accepted auditing standards, and the Committee issued a booklet titled Generally Accepted Auditing Standards—Their Significance and Scope to adopt the SEC’s requirement. In 1963, the Committee issued Statement on Auditing Procedure No. 33 to consolidate and replace various pronouncements issued between 1949 and 1963, including pamphlets and statements.

In 1972, the AICPA implemented significant changes to its standard-setting practices by consolidating all auditing pronouncements up to that date under Statements on Auditing Standards (SAS), and gave the Committee the title of senior technical committee on auditing matters while changing its name to Auditing Standards Executive Committee. From 1972 through 1978 the Executive Committee issued SAS as the authoritative guidelines and rules for auditing, issuing a total of 23 SAS.

=== Creation of the ASB ===
In October 1978, following extensive studies by the AICPA and its sub-committees, its governing council established the Auditing Standards Board as the maximum authoritative body in establishing GAAS, thereby consolidating and replacing all previous senior technical committees. It required all AICPA members and public accountants to adhere to the ASB’s pronouncements in relation to audit, attestation, and quality control. The ASB would now define auditor responsibilities and provide guidance to allow them to accomplish work and emit a report, among others.

=== Sarbanes–Oxley and the PCAOB ===
The Sarbanes–Oxley Act of 2002, as amended by the Dodd–Frank Act, changed the hierarchy of generally accepted auditing principles and standards. The legislation established that the new Public Company Accounting Oversight Board (PCAOB) and the Securities Exchange Commission (SEC) now had final authority over auditing regulation and public-auditor professional-practices standards for audits of public companies, also referred to as "issuers". Public accountants and firms who audit public companies were required to register with the PCAOB and follow all standards, principles, rules, and interpretations issued by the PCAOB in regard to public company audits and audit reports, as well as attestation and quality control. The PCAOB adopted the ASB's auditing and attest standards as its temporary auditing rules in 2003.

The AICPA subsequently changed the designation of the leading GAAS-setting authority in February 2004. It designated the PCAOB as the authoritative body for GAAS related to public companies, while the ASB was designated for non-public companies.

== Current Board membership ==
Current Board Members
Board member	Representing industry
Halie Creps (Chair)	KPMG LLP
Michael Bingham	GAO
Melissa Bonsall	
Jeremy Dillard	SingerLewak
Holly Engelhart	Eide Bailly LLP
Heather Funsch	Rehmann Robson, LLC
Kathleen K. Healy	PWC LLP
Staci Henshaw	Virginia State Auditor of Public Accounts Office
David Holt	Brady Martz
Greg Jenkins	Auburn University
Nora Kilaghbian	Capital Group (Retired)
Michael Manspeaker	SEK, CPAs & Advisors
Carole McNees	Plante Moran
Christine Quintana	EY LLP
Laura Schuetze	Grant Thornton LLP
G. Alan Skinner	Carr, Riggs & Ingram, LLC
Michael Schmitz	Schmitz-Holmstrom, LLP
Daniel O. Trujillo	TKM, LLC
David C. Ware	Gibson, Dunn & Crutcher

The Auditing Standards Board consists of 19 members (see table for current Board members), each nominated by the Director of the AICPA Audit and Attest Standards Staff and approved by the AICPA Board of Directors. The Board has a Chairman to direct Board meetings and to establish procedures, sub-committees, and perform other similar tasks in conjunction with the Director. To assure that the different industries and sectors are represented, the AICPA has reserved nominations for different industry segments as part of its operating policies:

- 5 seats for public accounting firms at a local, regional or national level, but are not considered part of the "Big Four" accounting firms.
- 4 seats for Big Four accounting firms
- 5 seats for representatives of the National Association of State Boards of Accountancy (NASBA), including current and former members of State boards of accountancy.
- 5 seats for other public accountants, members of the AICPA, and financial statement users (i.e. private industry). The AICPA typically reserves one of these for a person within the academic community and another for a government official, government auditor, or similar representative.

Board members serve a one-year term, after which they are evaluated by the AICPA for their performance, and can then be re-appointed for up to 3 one-year terms, or dismissed by the AICPA. The AICPA may extend the term of service if, for example, the member is working on a long-term project and the AICPA believes that such participation is crucial for the completion of the project.

== ASB Meetings ==
ASB proposed pronouncements are discussed within the ASB membership, the AICPA and with the general public. The ASB meets periodically to discuss auditing issues and prepare and draft pronouncement proposals, and occasionally holds public hearings. The meetings are considered informal (no set of formal rules) to encourage open deliberation between its members,. Matters which affect public interest, such as proposals of new SAS, are open to the public. The meetings and hearings are established by the ASB Chair, with public notices and meeting highlights and summaries printed in The CPA Letter, and on the AICPA website. A quorum comprises the majority of ASB members or their representatives, and other members of the AICPA are usually invited also.

Proposed pronouncements are discussed in the ASB meetings, and the board members must vote before to issuing a draft proposal (called an "exposure draft") or the final version to the public with two-thirds of ASB members in favor. The voting results are included in the meeting highlights published, and any ASB member who dissents from issuing a pronouncement may request that the reasons for dissenting be included in the exposure draft or final pronouncement.

== Primary sources ==
- Auditing, Attestation, and Quality Control Standards Setting Activities: Operating Policies (2004), American Institute of Certified Public Accountants
