= AICPA Code of Professional Conduct =

The AICPA Code of Professional Conduct is a collection of codified statements issued by the American Institute of Certified Public Accountants that outline a CPA's ethical and professional responsibilities. The code establishes standards for auditor independence, integrity and objectivity, responsibilities to clients and colleagues and acts discreditable to the accounting profession. The AICPA is responsible for drafting, revising and reissuing the code annually, on June 1.

== History ==
Joseph Edmund Sterrett outlined the debate and issues in setting up a Code of Professional Conduct in his address to the annual meeting of the American Association of Public Accountants in 1907 The earliest "official" version of the code of professional conduct among American accountants was issued by the American Institute of Accountants on April 9, 1917.

== Notable sections ==
=== Section 51 - Preamble ===
The opening principle of the code is that membership, and therefore adherence, to the code is voluntary. This means that an accountant is never under a legal responsibility to adhere to the code, and can renounce the code and membership in the AICPA at any time.

=== Section 101 - Independence ===
Section 101 sets forth the various requirements to establish auditor independence and conditions that nullify it. Knowingly allowing a member who is not independent to continue to work on an engagement can result in disciplinary action from the AICPA, including possible revocation of the members status as a CPA. Generally, the following actions will impair auditor independence:

- Authorizing, executing or consummating a transaction, or otherwise exercising authority on behalf of a client or having the authority to do so.
- Preparing source documents, in electronic or other form, evidencing the occurrence of a transaction.
- Having custody of client assets.
- Supervising client employees in the performance of their normal recurring activities.
- Determining which recommendations of the member should be implemented.
- Reporting to the board of directors on behalf of management.
- Serving as a client's stock transfer or escrow agent, registrar, general counsel or its equivalent.
- Establishing or maintaining internal controls, including performing ongoing monitoring activities.

Auditor independence is impaired if a member on the engagement team has a direct or material indirect financial interest in the client. Member's on the engagement team are not allowed to be on the board of trustees of a trust that owns, or has committed to owning more than 10% of the client's equity. A member or any of their immediate family are not allowed to own more than 5% of the clients equity. For the period being audited, the auditor is not allowed to operate as an officer, director, manager, promoter, underwriter or voting trustee for the client. If a member leaves the auditing firm and is employed by the client, the entire firms independence is deemed to be impaired. If an audit member is made a job offer by the client and does not immediately report and remove themselves from the engagement, their independence is impaired. However, if the member does report the job offer and rejects it, and is no longer being considered for a position with the client, then their independence is not impaired.

When the auditing member has a previous employment relationship with the client, barring certain exceptions, the auditor is required to liquidate any employee welfare programs that they have vested benefits in and collect or pay any loans outstanding to the client. The immediate family of the auditor is considered part of the test for impairment of independence. The exception to this is that the immediate family members of auditors are allowed to work for the client in non-management roles. If the auditor provides non-attest services such as tax support or consulting, they are required to adhere to the independence requirements of other regulatory bodies that govern those services. Failure to do so will impair their independence for their audit engagement as well.

== List of AICPA Code of Conduct and by-laws sections from AICPA Professional standards, 1974-2007 ==
No.	Date	Official title
1974	September 1	AICPA Professional Standards: Ethics, Bylaws, as of September 1, 1974 full-text
1975	September 1	AICPA Professional Standards: Ethics, Bylaws, as of September 1, 1975 full-text
1976	July 1	AICPA Professional Standards: Ethics, Bylaws, as of July 1, 1976 full-text
1977	July 1	AICPA Professional Standards: Ethics, Bylaws, as of July 1, 1977 full-text
1978	July 1	AICPA Professional Standards: Ethics, Bylaws, Quality control, as of July 1, 1978 full-text
1979	July 1	AICPA Professional Standards: Ethics, Bylaws, Quality control, as of July 1, 1979 full-text
1980	June 1	AICPA Professional Standards: Ethics, Bylaws, Quality control, as of June 1, 1980 full-text
1981	June 1	AICPA Professional Standards: Ethics, Bylaws, Quality control, as of June 1, 1981 full-text
1982	June 1	AICPA Professional Standards: Ethics, Bylaws, as of June 1, 1982 full-text
1983	June 1	AICPA Professional Standards: Ethics, Bylaws, as of June 1, 1983 full-text
1984	June 1	AICPA Professional Standards: Ethics, Bylaws, as of June 1, 1984 full-text
1985	June 1	AICPA Professional Standards: Ethics, Bylaws, as of June 1, 1985 full-text
1986	June 1	AICPA Professional Standards: Ethics, Bylaws, as of June 1, 1986 full-text
1987	June 1	AICPA Professional Standards: Ethics, Bylaws, as of June 1, 1987 full-text
1988	June 1	AICPA Professional Standards: Code of conduct, Bylaws, as of June 1, 1988 full-text
1989	October 1	AICPA Professional standards: Code of conduct, Bylaws, as of October 1, 1989 full-text
1990	June 1	AICPA professional standards: Code of conduct, Bylaws, as of June 1, 1990 full-text
1991	June 1	AICPA Professional Standards: Code of Conduct, Bylaws, as of June 1, 1991 full-text
1992	June 1	AICPA professional standards: Code of professional conduct and Bylaws as of June 1, 1992 full-text
1993	June 1	AICPA professional standards: Code of professional conduct and bylaws as of June 1, 1993 full-text
1994	June 1	AICPA professional standards: Code of professional conduct and bylaws as of June 1, 1994 full-text
1995	June 1	AICPA professional standards: Code of professional conduct and bylaws as of June 1, 1995 full-text
1996	June 1	AICPA professional standards: Code of professional conduct and bylaws as of June 1, 1996 full-text
1997	June 1	AICPA professional standards: Code of professional conduct as of June 1, 1997 full-text
1997	June 1	AICPA professional standards: Bylaws as of June 1, 1997
1998	June 1	AICPA professional standards: Code of professional conduct as of June 1, 1998 full-text
1998	June 1	AICPA professional standards: Bylaws as of June 1, 1998
1999	April 1	AICPA professional standards: Code of professional conduct and bylaws as of April 1, 1999 full-text
2000	June 1	AICPA professional standards: Code of professional conduct and bylaws as of June 1, 2000 full-text
2001	June 1	AICPA professional standards: Code of professional conduct and bylaws as of June 1, 2001 full-text
2002	June 1	AICPA professional standards: Code of professional conduct and bylaws as of June 1, 2002 full-text
2003	June 1	AICPA professional standards: Code of professional conduct and bylaws as of June 1, 2003 full-text
2004	June 1	AICPA professional standards: Code of professional conduct and bylaws as of June 1, 2004 full-text
2005	June 1	AICPA professional standards: Code of professional conduct and bylaws as of June 1, 2005 full-text
2006	June 1	AICPA professional standards: Code of professional conduct and bylaws as of June 1, 2006 full-text
2007	June 1	AICPA professional standards: Code of professional conduct and bylaws as of June 1, 2007 full-text

== List of AICPA Code of Conduct and By-Laws Sections published as pamphlets, 1917-1997 ==
Year	Date	Official title
1917	April 9	Rules of professional conduct : prepared by the Committee on Professional Ethics and approved by the Council April 9, 1917 full-text
1919	September 30	Rules of professional conduct : including amendments and additions prepared by the Committee on Professional Ethics and approved by the Council prior to September 30, 1919 full-text
1927		By-laws and rules of professional conduct as amended September, 1927 full-text
1930-1931		By-laws and rules of professional conduct, 1930-1931 full-text
1931-1932		By-laws and rules of professional conduct, 1931-1932 full-text
1936		By-laws and rules of professional conduct as amended to December 1, 1936 full-text
1937-1938		By-laws and rules of professional conduct, 1937-1938 full-text
1938-1939		By-laws and rules of professional conduct, 1938-1939 full-text
1940		By-laws and Rules of professional conduct, 1940 full-text
1941		By-laws and Rules of professional conduct, 1941 (as revised January 6, 1941) full-text
1942		By-laws and rules of professional conduct, 1942 full-text
1943		By-laws and rules of professional conduct, 1943 full-text
1944		By-laws and rules of professional conduct 1944 full-text
1945		By-laws and rules of professional conduct 1945 full-text
1946		By-laws and rules of professional conduct 1946 full-text
1948		By-laws and rules of professional conduct 1948 full-text
1949-1950		By-laws, rules of professional conduct 1949-1950 full-text
1950	December 18	By-laws, Rules of professional conduct, as amended by vote of the membership December 19, 1950 full-text
1952		By-laws, Rules of professional conduct 1952 full-text
1954	January 4	By-laws, Rules of professional conduct 1954 full-text
1956	January 9	By-laws, Rules of professional conduct 1956 full-text
1958		By-laws; Rules of professional conduct; Numbered opinions of the committee on professional ethics full-text
1959		By-laws, Rules of professional conduct, Numbered opinions of the Committee on Professional Ethics, 1959 full-text
1960	February 2	By-laws, Rules of professional conduct, Numbered opinions of the Committee on Professional Ethics, 1960 full-text
1961		By-laws, Rules of professional conduct, Numbered opinions of the Committee on Professional Ethics, Objectives of the Institute adopted by Council, 1961 full-text
1964		By-laws; Code of professional ethics; Numbered opinions of the Committee on Professional Ethics; Objectives of the Institute adopted by Council full-text
1965		By-laws; Code of professional ethics; Numbered opinions of the Committee on Professional Ethics; Objectives of the Institute adopted by Council full-text
1965		Code of professional ethics & numbered opinions 1965 full-text
1967	March 20	Code of professional ethics as amended March 4, 1965; By-laws as amended March 20, 1967; Numbered opinions of the Committee on Professional Ethics; Objectives of the Institute adopted by Council; Description of the Professional Practice of Certified Public Accountants full-text
1969	December 30	Code of professional ethics as amended December 30, 1969, and interpretative opinions full-text
1969		By-laws as amended February 20, 1969 full-text
1970		Summaries of ethics rulings
1972		Restatement of the code of professional conduct;Concepts of professional ethics; Rules of conduct; Interpretations of rules of conduct full-text
1973	March 1	Code of professional ethics, Effective March 1, 1973; Concepts of professional ethics; Rules of conduct; Interpretations of rules of conduct full-text
1974	March	Code of professional ethics, Effective March 1, 1973; March 1974 edition;Concepts of professional ethics; Rules of Professional ethics; Interpretations of rules of conduct full-text
1974	February 1	Bylaws as amended February 1, 1974; Implementing resolutions of Council; Objectives of the Institute; Description of the professional practice of certified public accountants full-text
1975	March	Code of professional ethics, Effective March 1, 1973, March 1975 edition;Concepts of professional ethics; Rules of conduct; Interpretations of rules of conduct full-text
1976	March 1	Code of professional ethics, March 1, 1976, edition; Concepts of professional ethics; Rules of conduct, effective March 1, 1973;Interpretations of rules of conduct; Ethics rulings full-text
1977	May 1	Code of professional ethics, May 1, 1977, edition;Concepts of professional ethics; Rules of conduct, effective March 1, 1973; Interpretations of rules of conduct; Ethics rulings full-text
1978	March 31	Rules of conduct as amended March 31, 1978;Bylaws and implementing resolutions of Council as amended March 31, 1978 full-text
1981	October 15	Bylaws and implementing resolutions of Council as amended October 15, 1981;Rules of conduct of the code of professional ethics as amended March 31, 1979 [1981] full-text
1983	May 10	Bylaws and implementing resolutions of Council as amended May 10, 1983;Rules of conduct of the code of professional ethics as amended January 6, 1983 full-text
1984		Concepts of professional ethics; Rules of conduct of the code of professional ethics as amended January 6, 1983; Bylaws and implementing resolutions of Council as amended May 10, 1983 [1984] full-text
1985	May 15	Concepts of professional ethics; Rules of conduct of the code of professional ethics as amended January 6, 1983; Bylaws and implementing resolutions of Council as amended May 15, 1985 full-text
1988	January 12	Code of professional conduct as adopted January 12, 1988; Bylaws and implementing resolutions of Council as amended January 12, 1988 full-text
1991	May 20	Code of professional conduct as amended May 20, 1991;Bylaws and implementing resolutions of Council as amended January 8, 1990 full-text
1992	January 14	Code of professional conduct as amended January 14, 1992; Bylaws and implementing resolutions of Council as amended January 14, 1992 full-text
1993	May 26	Code of professional conduct as amended January 14, 1992; Bylaws and implementing resolutions as amended May 26, 1993 full-text
1996	June 17	Code of professional conduct as amended January 14, 1992; Bylaws and implementing resolutions of Council as amended June 17, 1996 full-text
1997	October 28	Code of professional conduct and implementing resolutions of Council as amended October 28, 1997; Bylaws and implementing resolutions of Council as amended October 28, 1997 full-text
