= Forum for International Trade Training =

Forum for International Trade Training (FITT)
- Company type: Non-profit
- Industry: Import-export training and certification; international trade training and certification
- Founded: 1992
- Founder: Canadian Government and Private Sector
- Headquarters: Ottawa, ON, Canada
- Key people: Caroline Tompkins, CAE, CITP, President and CEO
- Number of employees: 10
- Website: https://www.fittfortrade.com/

The Forum for International Trade Training (FITT) is "a not-for-profit organization that offers international business training, resources and professional certification to individuals and businesses."

FITT offers the FITTskills international trade training program, a series of 6 courses for global business professionals that can be taken either online or in a classroom setting through educational partners. FITTskills students receive the FITT Certificate in International Trade after completing three of the courses, and the FITT Diploma in International Trade after completing all six courses.

The organization also offers the Certified International Trade Professional designation, also trademarked as the FITT International Business Professional designation in the U.S. and Europe. It is often referred to as the CITP|FIBP designation. In French, it is referred to as the Professionnel accrédité en commerce international (PACI|FPAI) designation.

FITT's strategic partners are Export Development Canada (EDC), Global Affairs Canada (GAC) and the World Trade Centers Association.

== History ==
In the late 1980s, Dieter Hollweck, began planning for a new organization. FITT was then incorporated in 1992 as part of Canada’s sector council initiative.

FITT first launched its FITTskills training program in 1993, which is now in its sixth edition, with the seventh edition being launched in early 2017. In 1996, it also launched the Prior Learning Assessment and Recognition (PLAR) process to allow business professionals to use their previous work and educational experience to earn FITTskills credits. FITTskills courses were first offered online in 1999, which continues today.

In 2001, FITT began to accredit academic institutions and organizations already offering international business courses to offer FITTskills courses. There are currently over 43 educational partners in Canada, China, Colombia, Malaysia, Romania and the UK, offering FITTskills courses in a classroom setting.

FITT's CITP designation was first offered in 1998, and the competency requirements were revised in 2006 and again in 2016. Since 2009, it has also been trademarked as the FIBP designation in the U.S. and Europe.

FITT has also awarded honorary CITP|FIBP designations to several notable figures in international trade, including former Canadian Deputy Prime Minister and Finance Minister John Manley, Canadian Chamber of Commerce CEO Perrin Beatty, Governor of the Bank of Canada Stephen Poloz, and former Canadian Minister of International Trade Stockwell Day.
