= University of Mississippi School of Business Administration =

Business school of the University of Mississippi

Coordinates: 34.366375°N 89.536136°W

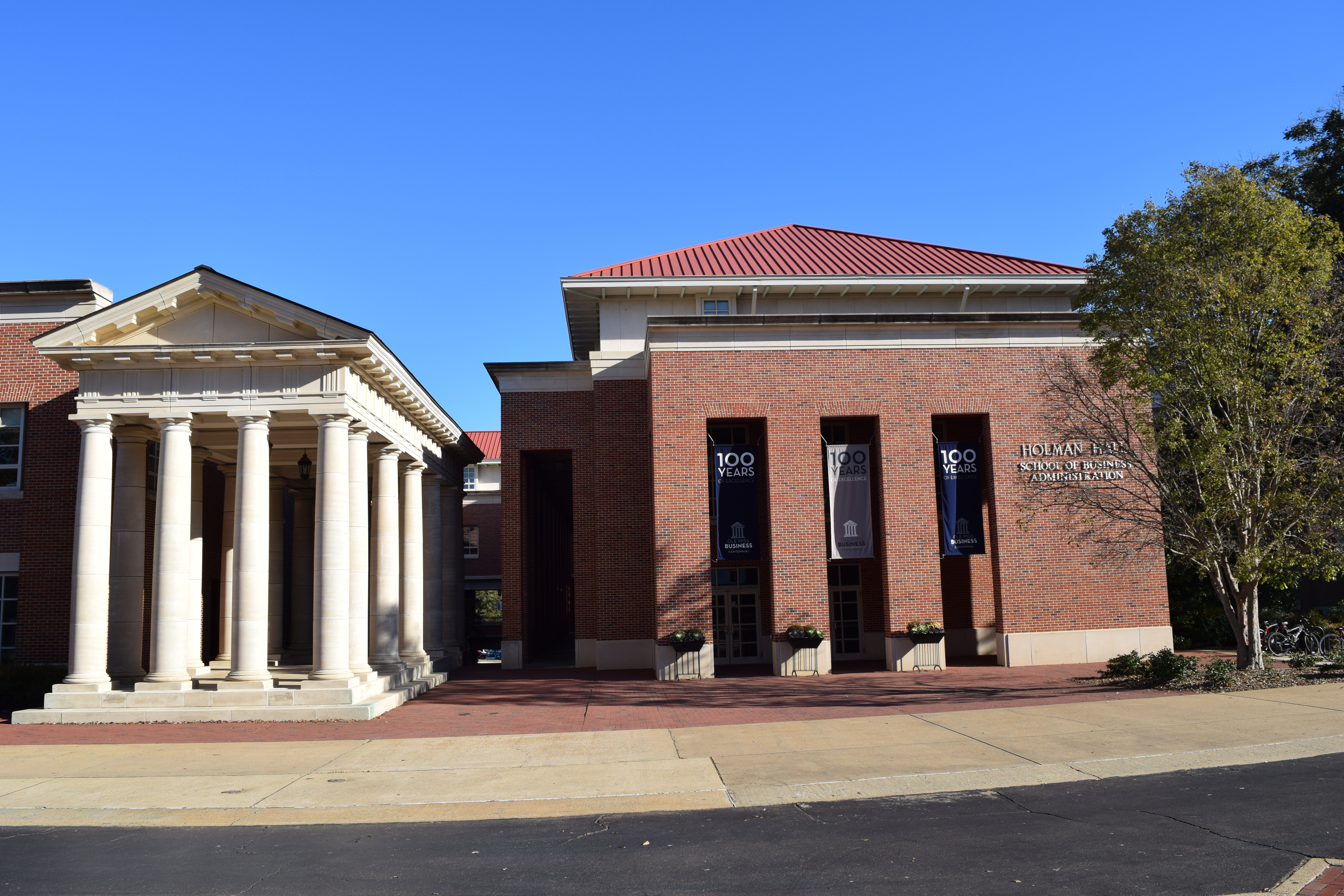
Holman Hall

The University of Mississippi School of Business Administration grants undergraduate, MBA, and Ph.D degrees that cover most business fields. It celebrated its centennial year of operation in 2017. In Fall 2018, enrollment is approximately 3800 students, including both undergraduate and graduate students. The School of Business Administrations make up almost one-fifth of the undergraduate enrollment at the university and is the largest business school in Mississippi.

The School of Business Administration was established in 1917 with an initial group of 150 students. It was the first business program in Mississippi and the first in the state to receive Association to Advance Collegiate Schools of Business (AACSB) accreditation (in 1946). The School was the first in the state of Mississippi to have an accredited Master of Business Administration (MBA) program. It awarded its first MBA degrees in 1946. Formerly housed in Conner Hall, the School moved to its current location in Holman Hall in 1997.

The School of Business Administration holds the charter of the Rho Tau chapter of Alpha Kappa Psi business fraternity. The Rho Tau chapter is one of the largest chapters in the world and has gained numerous awards for the accomplishments of its brothers. As a professional fraternity it promotes and fosters the study of business.

The School launched its first online degree program, the Ole Miss Online MBA, in January 2006. It was the first online program at the University of Mississippi and the first online MBA in Mississippi. The online MBA Program results in the same degree as the campus MBA Program with the same courses and instructors.

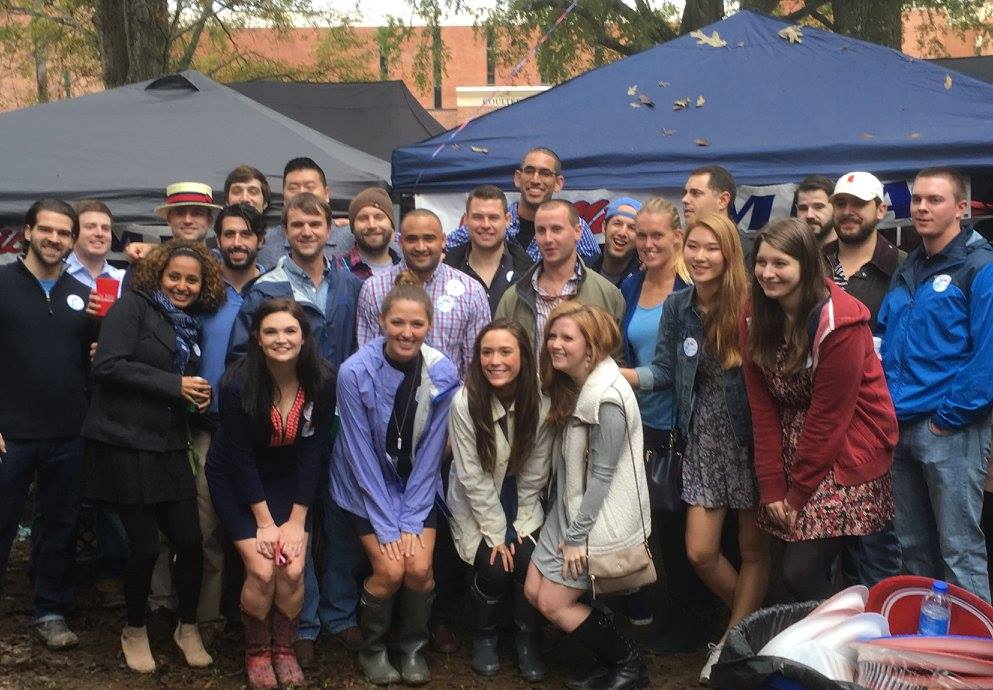
Ole Miss and Harvard MBA students networking in the Grove (2015)

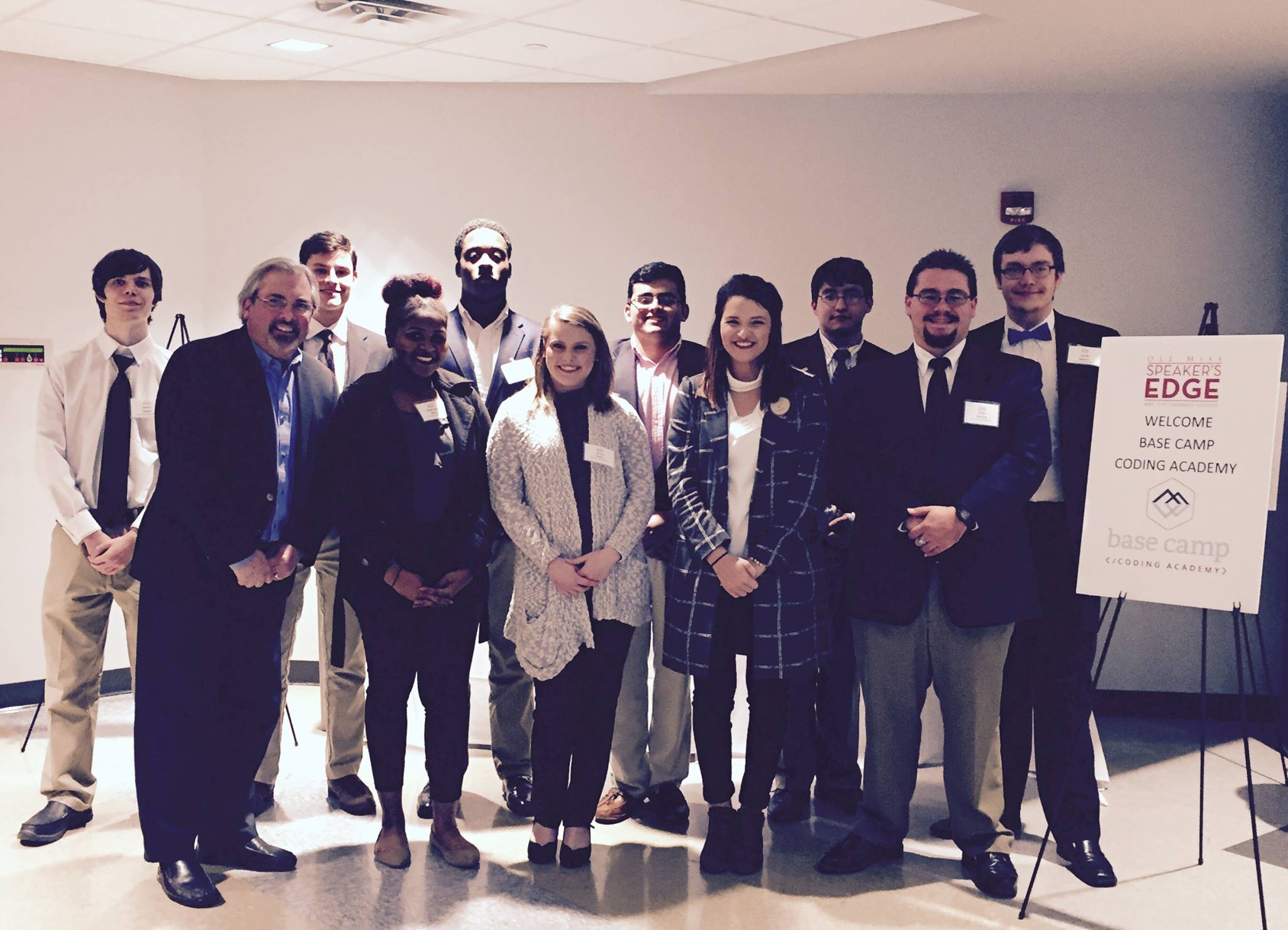
Base Camp Coding Academy students from the community were invited to shadow coaching sessions and paired with an MBA mentor for networking.

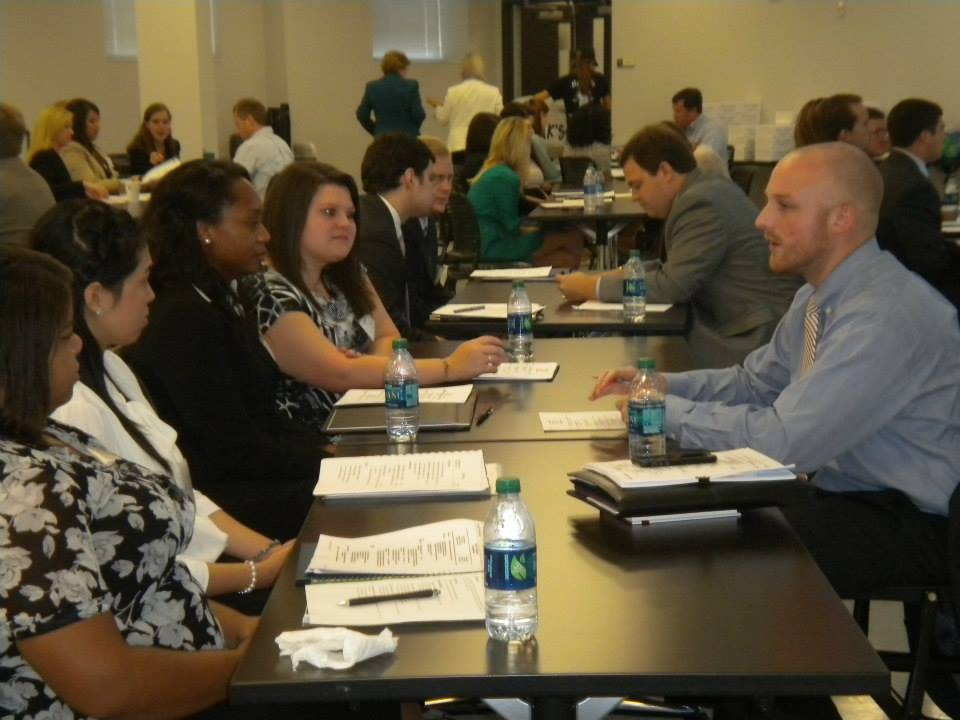
MBA Alumni Board members host professional development workshops for MBA students.

== Deans ==
1. James Warsaw Bell – 1917–1941
2. H. B. Brown – 1943–1949
3. McDonald K. Horne Jr. – 1949–1950
4. Clive Dunhan – 1950–1965
5. Ben B. McNew – 1969–1979
6. M. Lynn Spruill – 1980–1984
7. Rex L. Cottle −1985-1991
8. W. Randy Boxx – 1991–1999
9. Michael Harvey – 2001–2003
10. Brian Reithel – 2003–2007
11. Ken Cyree – 2008–present
