= Federal Reserve Bulletin =

Historic U.S. Central Bank Academic Journal

Publication Overview
- Publisher: Board of Governors of the Federal Reserve System
- First Issue: May 1915
- Final Issue: 2022 (Ceased publication)
- Format Changes: 1915–2003: Monthly print; 2004–2005: Quarterly print; 2006: Bi-annual print; 2007–2022: Online-first / Annual compilation

Purpose & Scope
- Core Mandate: Served as the official journal of record for Federal Reserve Board activities and policy implementation
- Primary Topics: Central banking operations, monetary policy, macroeconomic analysis, banking supervision, and legal updates
- Editorial Body: Federal Reserve Board's Publications Committee

Historical Content Breakdown
- Key Sections: Topical Board research & analysis; Quarterly legal developments; Domestic and international economic data
- Data Supplements: Financial and Business Statistics (Ended 2004); Statistical Supplement to the Federal Reserve Bulletin (Ended 2009)

Current Status & Access
- Digital Archive: Fully digitized and hosted by the St. Louis Fed's FRASER repository
- Modern Successors: Fed Working Papers, FEDS Notes, and the International Finance Discussion Papers

The Federal Reserve Bulletin was a bulletin from the Federal Reserve Board started in 1914 and published until 2022, intended as a vehicle to present policy issues.

== Content ==
According to the "About" section of the Bulletin's website: "Authors from the Federal Reserve Board's Research and Statistics, Monetary Affairs, International Finance, Banking Supervision and Regulation, Consumer and Community Affairs, Reserve Bank Operations, and Legal divisions contribute to the content published in the Bulletin, which includes topical research and analysis and quarterly "Legal Developments.""

Historically, the Federal Reserve Bulletin was published monthly as a paper bulletin, and then as an online bulletin. However, regular publication was discontinued after 2006. Currently, individual bulletin articles are released online. The schedule includes four "Legal Developments" articles, one for each quarter, but there is no predetermined schedule for the release of other articles. All articles released in a particular calendar year form one volume of the bulletin, that can be purchased in print or downloaded in full online.

== Accessibility ==
All volumes and articles of the bulletin can be accessed freely online. Print versions can be ordered for a fee.

The Federal Reserve Bulletin archives are also available through FRASER.

== History ==
The Federal Reserve Bulletin started out in 1914. Started May 1915, paper bulletins were released monthly. The practice of monthly publication continued without break until December 2003. In 2004 and 2005, the bulletin was published on a quarterly schedule. In 2006, publication was on a bi-annual schedule. Starting 2007, individual articles were simply released online and all articles released in a given year were compiled into a volume at the end of the year.

The Federal Reserve Board used to publish a Statistical Supplement to the Federal Reserve Bulletin, both print and online, but announced in December 2008 that it was discontinuing the Statistical Supplement, and instead pointed people to a detailed list of links to the most up-to-date data on the economy of the United States.
