= American Institute of Certified Public Accountants =

American trade group of financial transaction trackers

American Institute of CPAs
- Formation: 1887; 139 years ago
- Type: Not-for-Profit professional association
- Tax ID no.: 13-0432265
- Purpose: Accounting and Finance Certification and Membership
- Headquarters: Durham, North Carolina, U.S.
- Coordinates: 35°55′1.0194″N 78°58′57.36″W
- Region served: United States
- Members: 428,000 (2020)
- CEO: Mark Koziel, CPA, CGMA
- Chairman: Lexy Kessler, CPA, CGMA
- Affiliations: Association of International Certified Professional Accountants
- Revenue: ▼US$361.37 million (2020, including CIMA)
- Expenses: ▼US$324.89 million (2020, including CIMA)
- Website: www.aicpa-cima.com

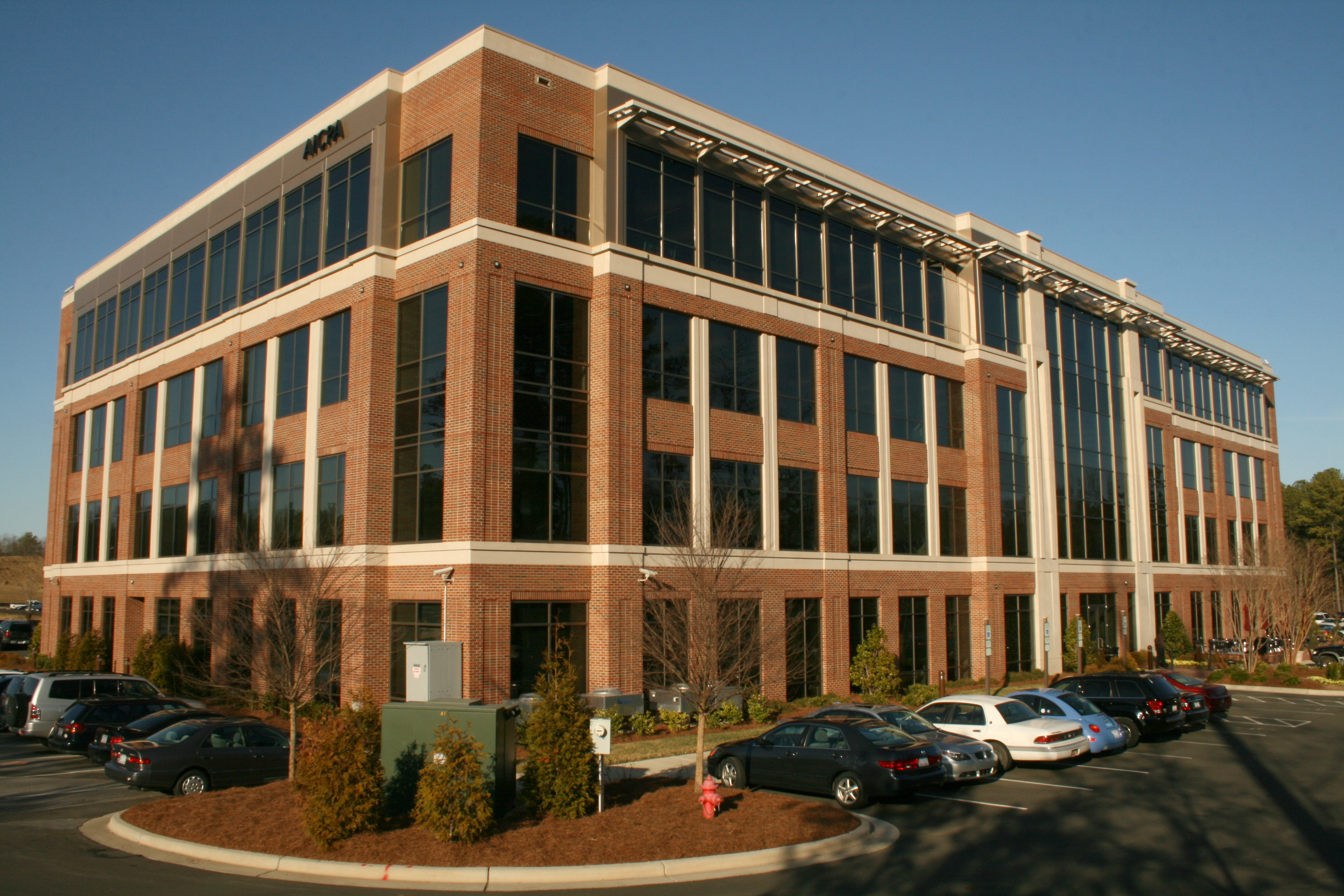
AICPA offices in Durham, North Carolina

The American Institute of Certified Public Accountants (AICPA) is the national professional organization of Certified Public Accountants (CPAs) in the United States, with more than 428,000 members in 130 countries. Founded in 1887 as the American Association of Public Accountants (AAPA), the organization sets ethical standards and U.S. auditing standards. It also develops and grades the Uniform CPA Examination. The AICPA is headquartered in Durham, North Carolina, and maintains additional offices in New York City, Washington, D.C., and Ewing, New Jersey.

== History ==
The AICPA and its predecessors date back to 1887, when the American Association of Public Accountants (AAPA) was formed. The Association went through several name changes over the years: the Institute of Public Accountants (1916), the American Institute of Accountants (1917), and the American Society of Public Accountants (1921), which merged into the American Institute of Accountants in 1936. At that time, the decision was made to restrict future membership to CPAs.

The number of committees grew continually over the years. In the 1940s, there were 34 committees. By 1960, there were 89. By 1970, the number had grown to 109.

In 1999, the nearly 120 existing committees underwent a re-organization with approximately half of the standing committees being replaced with a volunteer group model that placed an increased emphasis on the use of task forces. The increased use of task forces allowed for more targeted efforts with the task forces being given a specific assignment then disbanding upon completion of that assignment. Also in 1999, the first tracking and management of task forces began."

In January 2012, the AICPA entered into a joint venture with their equivalent in the UK, the Chartered Institute of Management Accountants (CIMA), a partnership that produced the Chartered Global Management Accountant (CGMA) designation. In 2014, the AICPA and the CIMA co-created the Global Management Accounting Principles (GMAPs).

The AICPA and CIMA membership bodies remain and provide all existing benefits to members.

In August 2019, the AICPA proposed a new standard to give auditors more guidance on auditing accounting estimates. This standard replaced SAS No. 122, Section 540, Auditing Accounting Estimates, Including Fair Value Accounting Estimates, and Related Disclosures. It also amended a few other sections of the AICPA Professional Standards.

== Programs ==
=== Uniform CPA examination ===
The Uniform CPA Examination must be taken and passed by all those who wish to be licensed as a CPA. The exam is developed and scored by the Board of Examiners (BOE), a committee that consists of CPAs, state board regulators, psychometricians, and educators.

=== Professional standards setting ===
The AICPA sets generally accepted professional and technical standards for CPAs in multiple areas. Until the 1970s, the AICPA held a virtual monopoly in this field. In the 1970s, however, it transferred its responsibility for setting generally accepted accounting principles (GAAP) to the newly formed Financial Accounting Standards Board (FASB). Following this, it retained its standards setting function in areas such as financial statement auditing, professional ethics, attest services, CPA firm quality control, CPA tax practice, business valuation, and financial planning practice. Before passage of the Sarbanes-Oxley law, AICPA standards in these areas were considered "generally accepted" for all CPA practitioners.

In the early 2000s, in response to events such as Enron's announcement that its financial statements couldn't be relied on and WorldCom's bankruptcy filing, Congress passed the Sarbanes-Oxley Act of 2002 (SOX).

=== Credentials, designations, and scholarships ===
The AICPA offers credentialing programs in certain subject areas for its members. The credentials are similar to state board certifications for attorneys, which also recognize subject matter-specific expertise. The AICPA offers the:

- Certified Public Accountant (CPA)
- Accredited in Business Valuation (ABV) credential
- Personal Financial Specialist (PFS) credential
- Certified in Financial Forensics (CFF) credential
- Certified Information Technology Professional (CITP) credential, which had been established in 2000.
- Certified in Entity and Intangible Valuations (CEIV) credential.

Along with CIMA, the AICPA issues the Chartered Global Management Accountant (CGMA) designation, which was established in 2012. Based on global quality standards for ethics and performance, CGMA designees are considered experts with credibility of advanced proficiency in finance, operations, strategy and management.

The institute offers a number of scholarships for high school students, undergraduate, and graduate students, and working professionals. This includes:

- The AICPA Foundation High School Scholarship
- The AICPA Legacy Scholarships
- The Minority Doctoral Fellowship Program
- The William (Bill) Ezzell Scholarship Program

=== Public interest campaigns ===
The AICPA also runs public interest programs, including the Feed the Pig campaign and the 360 Degrees of Financial Literacy site. Feed the Pig, a national public service campaign sponsored by the AICPA and the Ad Council, provides personal finance resources for young Americans. 360 Degrees of Financial Literacy is a national volunteer effort of the nation's CPAs to help Americans understand their personal finances and develop money management skills.

In 2022, the AICPA and the National Association of State Boards Accountancy announced that a new Uniform CPA exam would be released in 2024 as part of the CPA Evolution initiative. The new exam is based on a “Core + Discipline” model and will include core testing in accounting, auditing, and tax, as well as three Discipline sections (candidates must select one to complete).

In the face of deteriorating interest in the field the accounting field has been forced to address the problems that many minorities in the accounting field face. These hurdles present themselves as the cost of education, the strain of a 150-credit major during university, the extremely difficult CPA exam, or just hostile business practices, they all contribute to the larger problem of the incredibly high standards that come with being a certified accountant. However, the AICPA has made strides, along with other organizations, to ensure diversity and equality within the field.

Minorities and gender representation within the field of accounting have been a problem, with many efforts made to confront the looming problem. When looking at the number of registered CPAs in 1969, minorities made up 15% of all accountants. A lot of the reasons for such statistics are the numerous barriers that people of color have to face in order to even meet the qualifications to take the CPA exam. Even looking at the holistic picture of all college students enrolled in a Bachelor’s degree in the accounting program has steadily been decreasing since 2007. With the number of accountants needed in the growing job market, and interest in the profession dwindling, supporting accessibility to the career is essential. Specifically, the biggest barriers present would be the cost of education, as well as past efforts to refuse to acknowledge the credentials of those of said minorities, and denying them offers of employment.

The role of the difficulty of education is highlighted in studies done by the AICPA and the National Association of State Boards of Accountancy (NASBA) themselves. When altering and demonstrating a slightly shorter and less demanding version of the current CPA exam to college students, increased interest among all students, despite them not being enrolled in an accounting degree program. The AICPA’s success in progressing representation for minorities is best highlighted by its work with multiple professional associations and individual firms. One of the first actions taken by the AICPA was the creation of the Minority Recruitment and Equal Opportunity Committee, renamed the Minority Initiatives Committee (MIC) in 1969. The main goals of this committee were to promote small minority owned businesses, while also providing opportunities for minority men and women. Additionally, the AICPA also invests in working with schools by forming programs that allow for a pipeline directly from university to real-world accounting jobs through minority based schools, such as the historically black colleges and universities (HBCUs). These programs existed not only to help students navigate the complex and wide world of accounting inside and outside of a university environment, but also to ease the financial burden that the 150-credit major imposed. Additionally, there are even programs trying to garner interest from as early as 9th-grade high schoolers in the US, pioneered by companies such as PwC and Earnest & Youngin collaboration with other organizations.Even after graduation, the journey continues, and there has been advocacy that financial aid is necessary afterwards, when fully employed, in order to ensure qualified test takers and accountants are employed in the market.

In an effort to expand upon these previously established programs, the AICPA worked alongside other organizations, such as the National Association of Black Accountants (NABA) and the Association of Latino Professionals in Finance and Accounting (ALPFA), to increase minority representation in the accounting profession. These programs not only give strong mentoring opportunities but also give scholarships to help advance a select few promising students. As of 2013, the AICPA has been running the AICPA Scholarship for Minority Accounting Students for 40 years, which has provided over $14,600,000 in scholarships to over 8,000 students. Even the newly appointed vice-chair of the AICPA, Carla McCall, advocated for progress in diversity efforts and spearheads this sentiment with her own program in the AAFCPA’s Women’s Opportunity Network.

=== WebTrust ===
WebTrust is a family of e-commerce assurance and auditing programs co-developed by the AICPA with the Canadian Institute of Chartered Accountants (CICA). Accounting associations in the UK, Australia, New Zealand and Hong Kong also participate in the program. A specialized variant of the program exists for certificate authorities. A 2005 academic book noted that while cost of a WebTrust seal is considerably higher than that of similar products from its competitors (BBB On-Line, TrustE and VeriSign), the scope of a WebTrust certification is more comprehensive than those of its competitors, although this fact is usually lost on consumers who have trouble differentiating such seal programs, which explains the rather limited market penetration of WebTrust. A 2009 academic paper which chronicled in some depth the adoption followed by the abandonment of the WebTrust seal at a large US telecom company, noted that the management did not find the cost-benefit tradeoff worthwhile: the $100,000 per year cost for WebTrust being about twenty times higher than that of a TrustE seal.

=== External roles ===
The AICPA is a leading member of the International Federation of Accountants and the Global Accounting Alliance, and the Tax Professionals United for Taxpayer Relief Coalition.

The AICPA is an affiliate of the Institute of Chartered Accountants of the Caribbean.

=== Code of professional conduct ===
Members of the AICPA must attest annually to meeting the requirements for their membership types, complying with the AICPA's bylaws and upholding the AICPA's Code of Profession Conduct. Members are subject to audit and, if found to be non-compliant, may be expelled from the AICPA.

=== AICPA personal financial satisfaction index ===
Since Q3 of 2018, AICPA has been publishing the personal financial satisfaction index on a quarterly basis that indicates the general understanding of economic factors affecting the financial standing of a typical American. As the COVID-19 pandemic has strained the U.S. economy and put millions out of work, Americans have experienced the biggest drop in their personal financial satisfaction in more than a decade. The AICPA's Q1 2020 Personal Financial Satisfaction index (PFSi) measures 32.9, a 20 percent (8.29 point) decrease from the previous quarter. This is the largest quarterly drop the PFSi has experienced since the Great Recession (Q4 2009).

== See also ==
- AICPA Code of Professional Conduct
- FASB
- GASB
- IASB
- Philosophy of Accounting
