= Audit (disambiguation) =

An audit is an independent evaluation of an organization, process, project, product or system.

Audit, auditor or auditing may also refer to:

== Types of audit ==
- Academic audit, the completion of a course of study for which no assessment is completed or grade awarded
- Conformity assessment audit (ISO, HACCP, JCAHCO)
- Environmental audit
- Energy audit
- First Amendment audits, social movement involving photographing or filming from a public space
- Financial audit, the examination by an independent third party of the financial statements of a company
- Clinical audit, a process of the United Kingdom's National Health Service
- Internal audit
- Performance audit, an examination of a program, function, operation or the management systems and procedures of a governmental or non-profit entity
- Quality audit, a systematic, independent examination of a quality system
- Helpdesk and incident reporting auditing

== Computing ==
- Audit (telecommunication) - multiple meanings
- Audit trail
- Information technology security audit - a process that can verify that certain standards have been met
- Configuration audit (as part of configuration management)
- Information technology audit - an examination of the controls within an entity's Information technology infrastructure
- Software audit (disambiguation) - multiple meanings
- Auditor Security Collection, a Linux distribution which was merged into BackTrack

== Religion ==
- Auditing (Scientology), a procedure in Scientology
- Saint Auditor (Nectarius of Auvergne), Christian martyr of the 4th century

== Other uses ==
- Auditor, the head of a Student Society, especially in Ireland
- Auditors of Reality, characters in the Discworld novels

== Acronym ==
- AUDIT - Alcohol Use Disorders Identification Test
