= ISAE =

ISAE may stand for:

- International Society for Applied Ethology, behaviour and welfare of confined or domesticated animals
- Institut supérieur de l'aéronautique et de l'espace, National Higher French Institute of Aeronautics and Space
- International Standard on Assurance Engagement:
  - ISAE 3000
  - ISAE 3402
