= SecureDataRecovery =

Secure Data Recovery Services
- Type: Privately held
- Industry: Data security
- Founded: 2007; 19 years ago
- Headquarters: Los Angeles, California, U.S.
- Area served: Worldwide
- Services: Data recovery Digital forensics Data destruction
- Website: www.securedatarecovery.com

Secure Data Recovery Services provides data recovery and digital forensics services for a range of storage media, including laptop and desktop computer hard drives, HDD, SSD, RAID arrays, mobile devices, legacy storage systems, digital cameras, flash USB drives, and flash memory cards.

== History ==
Secure Data Recovery Services began operations in 2007 with the establishment of its first lab facility in Los Angeles, California. Additional labs in Cleveland, Ohio and Toronto, Ontario in Canada, soon followed, each with Class 10 ISO 4 cleanrooms and advanced data security standards and certifications. The company now provides professional data recovery services to companies and organizations around the world.

Secure Data Recovery began offering digital forensics services in 2014, and the company added new products and services including several do-it-yourself Windows-based data recovery software solutions in 2016.

Secure Data Recovery Services maintains more than 250 business partnerships across North America, including the B&H Photo NYC Superstore in downtown Manhattan.

== Security certifications and practices ==
Secure Data Recovery Services undergoes audits and evaluations to maintain a range of professional certifications and to ensure compliance with specific federal and international regulations. All data handling practices within Secure Data Recovery labs are SSAE 18 Type II SOC 1, 2, and 3 audited to verify the safe handling of sensitive or protected information.

Data recovery operations take place in a Class 10 ISO 4 cleanroom, which reduces the risk of damage to sensitive internal drive components from airborne dust or other small particulates. Cleanrooms come in different ratings depending on the industry. Class 100 ISO 5 facilities permit 100 particles per square foot and are commonly used for manufacturing applications in the pharmaceutical and biotechnology sectors. Class 10 ISO cleanrooms filter air to no more than 10 particles per square foot. This cleanroom rating is generally given to manufacturers of semiconductors and other sensitive electronics technology.

Secure Data Recovery Services transfers recovered data on portable devices that are FIPS 140-2 Level 3 validated, a U.S. government computer security standard used to approve cryptographic modules. Secure Data Recovery Services is a member of the General Services Administration (GSA) schedule for approved government contractors, and the company provides data recovery services for local, state, and federal government agencies, as well as for all branches of the U.S. military.

Secure Data Recovery Services complies with the EU/U.S. Privacy Shield Framework administered and reviewed by TRUSTe to ensure privacy protection for the exchange of personal data for commercial purposes between the European Union and the United States. They also maintain compliance with the Payment Card Industry Data Security Standard (PCI-DSS) for all customer transactions to ensure the safe handling, storage, and processing of credit card information.

== Manufacturer partnerships ==
Secure Data Recovery Services maintains professional partnerships with several data storage manufacturers to provide specialized data recovery services that do not endanger existing warranties. Secure Data Recovery Services is a Western Digital Platinum Partner. Other manufacturing partnerships include Glyph, Oyen Digital, and Verbatim.

== Awards and achievements ==
In May 2021, Cyber Defence Magazine named Secure Data Recovery Services the market leader for data recovery.

== See also ==
- Data recovery
- Digital forensics
- List of data recovery companies
