= List of AICPA Audit and Accounting Guides =

The following is a list of the volumes of the Auditing and Accounting Guide series published by the American Institute of Certified Public Accountants (AICPA). The list was compiled using the resources of the University of Mississippi library. The list also includes titles from the earlier series: AICPA Accounting Guides and AICPA Industry Audit Guides. Links to full-text of the Guides are provided for many of the titles prior to 2000.

The Comments column provides references to sections of Accounting Standards Codification (ASC) which complement or supersede a particular Audit and Accounting Guide. The ASC is published by the Financial Accounting Standards Board, and access to the ASC is free through the Basic View on the FASB web site. The ASC became effective on July 1, 2009, and has since been the authoritative source for all U.S. GAAP.

Prior to the ASC, accounting standards were scattered over a number of publications issued by the FASB and the AICPA. Some publications were considered more authoritative than others, and a GAAP hierarchy of five levels was recognized; see Statement on Auditing Standards No. 69. The AICPA Industry Audit and Accounting Guides are part of the second tier of authoritative publications in the GAAP hierarchy.

== List of AICPA Audit and Accounting Guides ==
No.	Date	Official title	Comments
01-01	1987	Audits of agricultural producers and agricultural cooperatives full-text	
01-02	1992	Audits of agricultural producers and agricultural cooperatives with conforming changes as of May 1, 1992 full-text	
01-03	1993	Audits of agricultural producers and agricultural cooperatives with conforming changes as of May 1, 1993 full-text	
01-04	1994	Audits of agricultural producers and agricultural cooperatives with conforming changes as of May 1, 1994 full-text	
01-05	1996	Audits of agricultural producers and agricultural cooperatives with conforming changes as of May 1, 1996 full-text	
01-06	1997	Audits of agricultural producers and agricultural cooperatives with conforming changes as of May 1, 1997 full-text	
01-07	1998	Audits of agricultural producers and agricultural cooperatives with conforming changes as of May 1, 1998 full-text	
01-08	1999	Audits of agricultural producers and agricultural cooperatives with conforming changes as of May 1, 1999 full-text	
01-09	2000	Audits of agricultural producers and agricultural cooperatives with conforming changes as of May 1, 2000 full-text	
01-10	2001	Audits of agricultural producers and agricultural cooperatives with conforming changes as of May 1, 2001 full-text	
01-11	2002	Audits of agricultural producers and agricultural cooperatives with conforming changes as of May 1, 2002 full-text	
01-12	2003	Audits of agricultural producers and agricultural cooperatives with conforming changes as of May 1, 2003 full-text	
01-13	2004	Agricultural producers and agricultural cooperatives with conforming changes as of May 1, 2004 full-text	
01-14	2005	Agricultural producers and agricultural cooperatives with conforming changes as of May 1, 2005 full-text	
01-15	2006	Agricultural producers and agricultural cooperatives with conforming changes as of May 1, 2006 full-text	
01-16	2007	Agricultural producers and agricultural cooperatives with conforming changes as of May 1, 2007 full-text	
01-17	2008	Agricultural producers and agricultural cooperatives with conforming changes as of May 1, 2008 full-text	
02-01	1981	Audits of airlines full-text	
02-02	1988	Audits of airlines full-text	
02-03	1992	Audits of airlines, with conforming changes as of May 1, 1992 full-text	
02-04	1993	Audits of airlines, with conforming changes as of May 1, 1993 full-text	
02-05	1994	Audits of airlines, with conforming changes as of May 1, 1994 full-text	
02-06	1996	Audits of airlines, with conforming changes as of May 1, 1996 full-text	
02-07	1997	Audits of airlines, with conforming changes as of May 1, 1997 full-text	
02-08	1998	Audits of airlines, with conforming changes as of May 1, 1998 full-text	
02-09	1999	Audits of airlines, with conforming changes as of May 1, 1999 full-text	
02-10	2000	Audits of airlines, with conforming changes as of May 1, 2000 full-text	
02-11	2001	Audits of airlines, with conforming changes as of May 1, 2001 full-text	
02-12	2002	Audits of airlines, with conforming changes as of May 1, 2002 full-text	
02-13	2003	Audits of airlines, with conforming changes as of May 1, 2003 full-text	
02-14	2008	Airlines, new edition as of October 1, 2008 full-text	
02-15	2010	Airlines, with conforming changes as of May 1, 2010 full-text	See also ASC section 908
02-16	2011	Airlines, with conforming changes as of May 1, 2011	See also ASC section 908
02-17	2013	Airlines, with conforming changes as of March 1, 2013	See also ASC section 908
03-01	1998	Analytical procedures full-text	
03-02	2001	Analytical procedures, with conforming changes as of May 1, 2001 full-text	
03-04	2004	Analytical procedures, with conforming changes as of May 1, 2004 full-text	
03-05	2005	Analytical procedures, with conforming changes as of May 1, 2005 full-text	
03-06	2006	Analytical procedures, with conforming changes as of May 1, 2006 full-text	
03-07	2007	Analytical procedures, with conforming changes as of May 1, 2007 full-text	
03-08	2008	Analytical procedures, with conforming changes as of March 1, 2008 full-text	
03-09	2012	Analytical procedures, with conforming changes as of March 1, 2012	
03-10	2017	Analytical procedures, with conforming changes as of October 1, 2017	
04-01	2006	Assessing and responding to audit risk in a financial statement audit full-text	
04-02	2009	Assessing and responding to audit risk in a financial statement audit, revised edition as of October 1, 2009	
04-03	2012	Assessing and responding to audit risk in a financial statement audit, with conforming changes as of March 1, 2012	
04-04	2014	Assessing and responding to audit risk in a financial statement audit, with conforming changes as of September 1, 2014	
04-05	2016	Assessing and responding to audit risk in a financial statement audit, with conforming changes as of October 1, 2016	
05-01	1983	Audit sampling full-text	
05-02	1992	Audit sampling full-text	
05-02	1999	Audit sampling full-text	
05-03	2001	Audit sampling, new edition as of April 1, 2001 full-text	
05-04	2008	Audit sampling full-text	
05-05	2012	Audit sampling, March 1, 2012	
05-06	2014	Audit sampling, March 1, 2014	
05-07	2017	Audit sampling, May 1, 2017	
05-07	2017	Audit sampling, May 1, 2017	
05-07	2019	Audit sampling, December 1, 2019	
06-01	2001	Auditing revenue in certain industries, new edition as of June 1, 2001 full-text	
06-02	2004	Auditing revenue in certain industries, with conforming changes as of May 1, 2004 full-text	
06-03	2005	Auditing revenue in certain industries, with conforming changes as of May 1, 2005 full-text	
06-04	2006	Auditing revenue in certain industries, with conforming changes as of May 1, 2006 full-text	
06-05	2007	Auditing revenue in certain industries, with conforming changes as of May 1, 2007 full-text	
06-06	2008	Auditing revenue in certain industries, with conforming changes as of March 1, 2008 full-text	
06-07	2009	Auditing revenue in certain industries, with conforming changes as of March 1, 2009 full-text	
06-08	2010	Auditing revenue in certain industries, with conforming changes as of March 1, 2010 full-text	
06-09	2011	Auditing revenue in certain industries, with conforming changes as of March 1, 2011	
06-10	2012	Auditing revenue in certain industries, with conforming changes as of September 1, 2012	
07-01	1968	Audits of banks full-text	
07-02	1969	Audits of banks full-text	
07-03	1983	Audits of banks full-text	
07-04	1984	Audits of banks full-text	
07-05	1990	Audits of banks, as of December 31, 1990 full-text	
07-06	1992	Audits of banks, with conforming changes as of May 1, 1992 full-text	
07-07	1993	Audits of banks, with conforming changes as of May 1, 1993 full-text	
07-08	1994	Audits of banks, with conforming changes as of May 1, 1994 full-text	
07-09	1996	Banks and savings institutions, with conforming changes as of May 1, 1996 full-text	See Audits of Savings and Loan Institutions (1994) for earlier Guides
07-10	1997	Banks and savings institutions, with conforming changes as of May 1, 1997 full-text	
07-11	1998	Banks and savings institutions, with conforming changes as of May 1, 1998 full-text	
07-12	1999	Banks and savings institutions, with conforming changes as of May 1, 1999 full-text	
07-13	2000	Banks and savings institutions, with conforming changes as of May 1, 2000 full-text	Title ceased; Continued by Depository and Lending (2004)
08-01	1973	Audits of brokers and dealers in securities full-text	
08-02	1977	Audits of brokers and dealers in securities full-text	
08-03	1985	Audits of brokers and dealers in securities full-text	
08-04	1989	Audits of brokers and dealers in securities full-text	
08-05	1992	Audits of brokers and dealers in securities, with conforming changes as of May 1, 1992 full-text	
08-06	1993	Audits of brokers and dealers in securities, with conforming changes as of May 1, 1993 full-text	
08-07	1994	Audits of brokers and dealers in securities, with conforming changes as of May 1, 1994 full-text	
08-08	1997	Brokers and dealers in securities, new edition as of April 1, 1997 full-text	
08-09	1998	Brokers and dealers in securities, with conforming changes as of May 1, 1998 full-text	
08-10	1999	Brokers and dealers in securities, with conforming changes as of May 1, 1999 full-text	
08-11	2000	Brokers and dealers in securities, with conforming changes as of May 1, 2000 full-text	
08-12	2001	Brokers and dealers in securities, with conforming changes as of May 1, 2001 full-text	
08-13	2002	Brokers and dealers in securities, with conforming changes as of May 1, 2002 full-text	
08-14	2003	Brokers and dealers in securities, with conforming changes as of May 1, 2003 full-text	
08-15	2004	Brokers and dealers in securities, with conforming changes as of May 1, 2004 full-text	
08-16	2005	Brokers and dealers in securities, with conforming changes as of May 1, 2005 full-text	
08-17	2006	Brokers and dealers in securities, with conforming changes as of May 1, 2006 full-text	
08-18	2007	Brokers and dealers in securities, with conforming changes as of May 1, 2007 full-text	
08-19	2008	Brokers and dealers in securities, with conforming changes as of May 1, 2008 full-text	
08-20	2009	Brokers and dealers in securities, with conforming changes as of May 1, 2009 full-text	See also ASC section 940
08-21	2010	Brokers and dealers in securities, with conforming changes as of July 1, 2010 full-text	See also ASC section 940 (Financial Services--Brokers and Dealers)
08-22	2011	Brokers and dealers in securities, with conforming changes as of September 1, 2011	See also ASC section 940 (Financial Services--Brokers and Dealers)
08-23	2012	Brokers and dealers in securities, with conforming changes as of September 1, 2012	See also ASC section 940 (Financial Services--Brokers and Dealers)
08-24	2013	Brokers and dealers in securities, with conforming changes as of July 1, 2013	See also ASC section 940 (Financial Services--Brokers and Dealers)
08-24	2013	Brokers and dealers in securities, with conforming changes as of July 1, 2013	See also ASC section 940 (Financial Services--Brokers and Dealers)
08-25	2015	Brokers and dealers in securities, with conforming changes as of August 1, 2015	See also ASC section 940 (Financial Services--Brokers and Dealers)
08-26	2016	Brokers and dealers in securities, with conforming changes as of September 1, 2016	See also ASC section 940 (Financial Services--Brokers and Dealers)
08-27	2017	Brokers and dealers in securities, with conforming changes as of September 1, 2017	See also ASC section 940 (Financial Services--Brokers and Dealers)
08-28	2018	Brokers and dealers in securities, with conforming changes as of September 1, 2018	See also ASC section 940 (Financial Services--Brokers and Dealers)
08-29	2019	Brokers and dealers in securities, with conforming changes as of August 1, 2019	See also ASC section 940 (Financial Services--Brokers and Dealers)
08-30	2020	Brokers and dealers in securities, with conforming changes as of August 1, 2020	See also ASC section 940 (Financial Services--Brokers and Dealers)
09-01	1984	Audits of casinos full-text	
09-02	1992	Audits of casinos, with conforming changes as of May 1, 1992 full-text	
09-03	1993	Audits of casinos, with conforming changes as of May 1, 1993 full-text	
09-04	1994	Audits of casinos, with conforming changes as of May 1, 1994 full-text	
09-05	1996	Audits of casinos, with conforming changes as of May 1, 1996 full-text	
09-06	1997	Audits of casinos, with conforming changes as of May 1, 1997 full-text	
09-07	1998	Audits of casinos, with conforming changes as of May 1, 1998 full-text	
09-08	1999	Audits of casinos, with conforming changes as of May 1, 1999 full-text	
09-09	2000	Audits of casinos, with conforming changes as of May 1, 2000 full-text	
09-10	2001	Audits of casinos, with conforming changes as of May 1, 2001 full-text	
09-11	2002	Audits of casinos, with conforming changes as of May 1, 2002 full-text	
09-12	2003	Audits of casinos, with conforming changes as of May 1, 2003 full-text	
09-13	2004	Casinos, with conforming changes as of May 1, 2004 full-text	
09-14	2005	Casinos, with conforming changes as of May 1, 2005 full-text	
09-15	2006	Casinos, with conforming changes as of May 1, 2006 full-text	See AAG Gaming, new edition as of March 1, 2011;See also ASC section 924 (Entertainment--Casinos)
10-01	1950	Audits by certified public accountants full-text	
10-02	1962	Audits by certified public accountants full-text	
11-01	1973	Audits of colleges and universities full-text	
11-02	1975	Audits of colleges and universities full-text	
11-03	1992	Audits of colleges and universities, with conforming changes as of May 1, 1992 full-text	
11-04	1993	Audits of colleges and universities, with conforming changes as of May 1, 1993 full-text	
11-05	1994	Audits of colleges and universities, with conforming changes as of May 1, 1994 full-text	Ceased publication;Superseded by Not-for-Profits, new edition as of June 1, 1996
12-01	1991	Audits of common interest realty associations as of August 31, 1991 full-text	
12-02	1992	Common interest realty associations, with conforming changes as of May 1, 1992 full-text	
12-03	1993	Common interest realty associations, with conforming changes as of May 1, 1993 full-text	
12-04	1994	Common interest realty associations, with conforming changes as of May 1, 1994 full-text	
12-05	1996	Common interest realty associations, with conforming changes as of May 1, 1996 full-text	
12-06	1997	Common interest realty associations, with conforming changes as of May 1, 1997 full-text	
12-07	1998	Common interest realty associations, with conforming changes as of May 1, 1998 full-text	
12-08	1999	Common interest realty associations, with conforming changes as of May 1, 1999 full-text	
12-09	2000	Common interest realty associations, with conforming changes as of May 1, 2000 full-text	
12-10	2001	Common interest realty associations, with conforming changes as of May 1, 2001 full-text	
12-11	2002	Common interest realty associations, with conforming changes as of May 1, 2002 full-text	
12-12	2003	Common interest realty associations, with conforming changes as of May 1, 2003 full-text	
12-13	2004	Common interest realty associations, with conforming changes as of May 1, 2004 full-text	
12-14	2005	Common interest realty associations, with conforming changes as of May 1, 2005 full-text	
12-15	2006	Common interest realty associations, with conforming changes as of May 1, 2006 full-text	
12-16	2007	Common interest realty associations, with conforming changes as of May 1, 2007 full-text	
12-17	2008	Common interest realty associations, with conforming changes as of May 1, 2008 full-text	See also ASC section 972 (Real Estate--Common Interest Realty Associations)
13-01	2010	Compilation and review engagements March 1, 2010 full-text	
13-02	2011	Compilation and review engagements March 1, 2011	
13-03	2012	Compilation and review engagements March 1, 2012	
13-04	2013	Compilation and review engagements March 1, 2013	
13-05	2014	Compilation and review engagements March 1, 2014	See Preparation, Compilation, and Review Engagements for continuation of series
14-01	1979	Computer-assisted audit techniques full-text	
15-01	1990	Consideration of internal control in a financial statement audit full-text	
15-02	1996	Consideration of internal control in a financial statement audit full-text	
16-01	1959	Generally accepted accounting principles for contractors full-text	
16-01a	1959	Auditing in the construction industry full-text	
16-02	1965	Audits of Construction contractors full-text	
16-03	1981	Construction contractors full-text	
16-04	1990	Audits of Construction contractors as of December 31, 1990 full-text	
16-05	1992	Construction contractors, with conforming changes as of May 1, 1992 full-text	
16-06	1993	Construction contractors, with conforming changes as of May 1, 1993 full-text	
16-07	1994	Construction contractors, with conforming changes as of May 1, 1994 full-text	
16-08	1996	Construction contractors, with conforming changes as of May 1, 1996 full-text	
16-09	1997	Construction contractors, with conforming changes as of May 1, 1997 full-text	
16-10	1998	Construction contractors, with conforming changes as of May 1, 1998 full-text	
16-11	1999	Construction contractors, with conforming changes as of May 1, 1999 full-text	
16-12	2000	Construction contractors, with conforming changes as of May 1, 2000 full-text	
16-13	2001	Construction contractors, with conforming changes as of May 1, 2001 full-text	
16-14	2002	Construction contractors, with conforming changes as of May 1, 2002 full-text	
16-15	2003	Construction contractors, with conforming changes as of May 1, 2003 full-text	
16-16	2004	Construction contractors, with conforming changes as of May 1, 2004 full-text	
16-17	2005	Construction contractors, with conforming changes as of May 1, 2005 full-text	
16-18	2006	Construction contractors, with conforming changes as of May 1, 2006 full-text	
16-19	2007	Construction contractors, with conforming changes as of May 1, 2007 full-text	
16-20	2008	Construction contractors, with conforming changes as of May 1, 2008 full-text	
16-21	2009	Construction contractors, with conforming changes as of May 1, 2009 full-text	
16-22	2010	Construction contractors, with conforming changes as of May 1, 2010 full-text	
16-23	2011	Construction contractors, with conforming changes as of May 1, 2011	See also ASC section 910 (Contractors--Construction)
16-24	2012	Construction contractors, with conforming changes as of May 1, 2012	See also ASC section 910 (Contractors--Construction)
16-25	2013	Construction contractors, with conforming changes as of May 1, 2013	See also ASC section 910 (Contractors--Construction)
16-26	2014	Construction contractors, with conforming changes as of May 1, 2014	See also ASC section 910 (Contractors--Construction)
16-27	2015	Construction contractors, with conforming changes as of May 1, 2015	See also ASC section 910 (Contractors--Construction)
16-28	2016	Construction contractors, with conforming changes as of May 1, 2016	See also ASC section 910 (Contractors--Construction)
16-29	2017	Construction contractors, with conforming changes as of July 1, 2017	See also ASC section 910 (Contractors--Construction)
16-30	2018	Construction contractors, with conforming changes as of July 1, 2018	See also ASC section 910 (Contractors--Construction)
16-31	2019	Construction contractors, with conforming changes as of August 1, 2019	See also ASC section 910 (Contractors--Construction)
16-32	2020	Construction contractors, with conforming changes as of July 1, 2020	See also ASC section 910 (Contractors--Construction)
17-01	1934	Audits of corporate accounts full-text	
18-01	1986	Audits of credit unions full-text	
18-02	1992	Audits of credit unions, with conforming changes as of May 1, 1992 full-text	
18-03	1992	Audits of credit unions, with conforming changes as of December 1, 1992 full-text	
18-04	1994	Audits of credit unions, with conforming changes as of May 1, 1994 full-text	
18-05	1996	Audits of credit unions, with conforming changes as of May 1, 1996 full-text	
18-06	1997	Audits of credit unions, with conforming changes as of May 1, 1997 full-text	
18-07	1998	Audits of credit unions, with conforming changes as of May 1, 1998 full-text	
18-08	1999	Audits of credit unions, with conforming changes as of May 1, 1999 full-text	
18-09	2000	Audits of credit unions, with conforming changes as of May 1, 2000 full-text	Title ceased; Credit Unions included in Depository and Lending Institutions 2004
19-01	2004	Depository and lending institutions: banks and savings institutions, credit unions, finance companies and mortgage companies, new edition as of January 1, 2004 full-text	For Previous titles see Banks and savings institutions (2000), Audits of credit unions (2000), Audits of finance companies (200)
19-02	2005	Depository and lending institutions: banks and savings institutions, credit unions, finance companies and mortgage companies, with conforming changes as of May 1, 2005 full-text	
19-03	2006	Depository and lending institutions: banks and savings institutions, credit unions, finance companies and mortgage companies, with conforming changes as of May 1, 2006 full-text	
19-04	2007	Depository and lending institutions: banks and savings institutions, credit unions, finance companies and mortgage companies, with conforming changes as of May 1, 2007 full-text	
19-05	2008	Depository and lending institutions: banks and savings institutions, credit unions, finance companies and mortgage companies, with conforming changes as of May 1, 2008 full-text	
19-06	2009	Depository and lending institutions: banks and savings institutions, credit unions, finance companies and mortgage companies, with conforming changes as of June 1, 2009 full-text	See also ASC sections 942(Financial Services--Depository and lending), 946 (Financial Services--Investment Companies), and 948 (Financial Services--Mortgage Banking)
19-07	2010	Depository and lending institutions: banks and savings institutions, credit unions, finance companies and mortgage companies, with conforming changes as of June 1, 2010 full-text	See also ASC sections 942(Financial Services--Depository and lending), 946 (Financial Services--Investment Companies), and 948 (Financial Services--Mortgage Banking)
19-08	2011	Depository and lending institutions: banks and savings institutions, credit unions, finance companies and mortgage companies, with conforming changes as of August 1, 2011	See also ASC sections 942(Financial Services--Depository and lending), 946 (Financial Services--Investment Companies), and 948 (Financial Services--Mortgage Banking)
19-09	2012	Depository and lending institutions: banks and savings institutions, credit unions, finance companies and mortgage companies, with conforming changes as of July 1, 2012	See also ASC sections 942(Financial Services--Depository and lending), 946 (Financial Services--Investment Companies), and 948 (Financial Services--Mortgage Banking)
19-10	2013	Depository and lending institutions: banks and savings institutions, credit unions, finance companies and mortgage companies, with conforming changes as of July 1, 2013	See also ASC sections 942(Financial Services--Depository and lending), 946 (Financial Services--Investment Companies), and 948 (Financial Services--Mortgage Banking)
19-11	2014	Depository and lending institutions: banks and savings institutions, credit unions, finance companies and mortgage companies, with conforming changes as of July 1, 2014	See also ASC sections 942(Financial Services--Depository and lending), 946 (Financial Services--Investment Companies), and 948 (Financial Services--Mortgage Banking)
19-12	2015	Depository and lending institutions: banks and savings institutions, credit unions, finance companies and mortgage companies, with conforming changes as of July 1, 2015	See also ASC sections 942(Financial Services--Depository and lending), 946 (Financial Services--Investment Companies), and 948 (Financial Services--Mortgage Banking)
19-13	2016	Depository and lending institutions: banks and savings institutions, credit unions, finance companies and mortgage companies, with conforming changes as of July 1, 2016	See also ASC sections 942(Financial Services--Depository and lending), 946 (Financial Services--Investment Companies), and 948 (Financial Services--Mortgage Banking)
19-14	2017	Depository and lending institutions: banks and savings institutions, credit unions, finance companies and mortgage companies, with conforming changes as of July 1, 2017	See also ASC sections 942(Financial Services--Depository and lending), 946 (Financial Services--Investment Companies), and 948 (Financial Services--Mortgage Banking)
19-15	2018	Depository and lending institutions: banks and savings institutions, credit unions, finance companies and mortgage companies, with conforming changes as of July 1, 2018	See also ASC sections 942(Financial Services--Depository and lending), 946 (Financial Services--Investment Companies), and 948 (Financial Services--Mortgage Banking)
19-16	2019	Depository and lending institutions: banks and savings institutions, credit unions, finance companies and mortgage companies, with conforming changes as of July 1, 2019	See also ASC sections 942(Financial Services--Depository and lending), 946 (Financial Services--Investment Companies), and 948 (Financial Services--Mortgage Banking)
19-17	2020	Depository and lending institutions: banks and savings institutions, credit unions, finance companies and mortgage companies, with conforming changes as of July 1, 2020	See also ASC sections 942(Financial Services--Depository and lending), 946 (Financial Services--Investment Companies), and 948 (Financial Services--Mortgage Banking)
20-01	2001	Auditing derivative instruments, hedging activities, and investments in securities, new edition as of March 1, 2001 full-text	
20-02	2005	Auditing derivative instruments, hedging activities, and investments in securities, with conforming changes as of May 1, 2005 full-text	
20-03	2006	Auditing derivative instruments, hedging activities, and investments in securities, with conforming changes as of May 1, 2006 full-text	
20-04	2007	Auditing derivative instruments, hedging activities, and investments in securities, with conforming changes as of May 1, 2007 full-text	
20-05	2008	Auditing derivative instruments, hedging activities, and investments in securities, with conforming changes as of May 1, 2008 full-text	
20-06	2009	Auditing derivative instruments, hedging activities, and investments in securities, with conforming changes as of May 1, 2009 full-text	See also ASC section 815 (Derivatives and Hedging)
20-07	2010	Auditing derivative instruments, hedging activities, and investments in securities, with conforming changes as of August 1, 2010 full-text	See also ASC section 815 (Derivatives and Hedging)
20-08	2011	Auditing derivative instruments, hedging activities, and investments in securities, with conforming changes as of June 1, 2011	See also ASC section 815 (Derivatives and Hedging)
21-01	1972	Audits of employee health and welfare benefit funds full-text	
21-02	1983	Audits of employee benefit plans full-text	
21-03	1989	Audits of employee benefit plans full-text	
21-04	1991	Audits of employee benefit plans, as of March 31, 1991 full-text	
21-05	1992	Audits of employee benefit plans, with conforming changes as of May 1, 1992 full-text	
21-06	1993	Audits of employee benefit plans, with conforming changes as of May 1, 1993 full-text	
21-07	1994	Audits of employee benefit plans, with conforming changes as of May 1, 1994 full-text	
21-08	1995	Audits of employee benefit plans, with conforming changes as of May 1, 1995 full-text	
21-09	1996	Audits of employee benefit plans, with conforming changes as of May 1, 1996 full-text	
21-10	1997	Audits of employee benefit plans, with conforming changes as of May 1, 1997 full-text	
21-11	1998	Audits of employee benefit plans, with conforming changes as of May 1, 1998 full-text	
21-12	1999	Audits of employee benefit plans, with conforming changes as of May 1, 1999 full-text	
21-13	2000	Audits of employee benefit plans, with conforming changes as of May 1, 2000 full-text	
21-14	2001	Audits of employee benefit plans, with conforming changes as of May 1, 2001 full-text	
21-15	2002	Audits of employee benefit plans, with conforming changes as of May 1, 2002 full-text	
21-16	2003	Audits of employee benefit plans, with conforming changes as of March 1, 2003 full-text	
21-17	2004	Employee benefit plans, with conforming changes as of March 1, 2004 full-text	
21-18	2005	Employee benefit plans, with conforming changes as of March 1, 2005 full-text	
21-19	2006	Employee benefit plans, with conforming changes as of March 1, 2006 full-text	
21-20	2007	Employee benefit plans, with conforming changes as of March 1, 2007 full-text	
21-21	2008	Employee benefit plans, with conforming changes as of March 1, 2008 full-text	
21-22	2009	Employee benefit plans, with conforming changes as of March 1, 2009 full-text	See also ASC sections 960 (Plan Accounting--Defined Benefit Pension Plans), 962 (Plan Accounting--Defined Contribution Pension Plans), 965 (Plan Accounting--Health and Welfare Benefit Plans)
21-23	2010	Employee benefit plans, with conforming changes as of March 1, 2010full-text	See also ASC sections 960 (Plan Accounting--Defined Benefit Pension Plans), 962 (Plan Accounting--Defined Contribution Pension Plans), 965 (Plan Accounting--Health and Welfare Benefit Plans)
21-24	2011	Employee benefit plans, with conforming changes as of March 1, 2011	See also ASC sections 960 (Plan Accounting--Defined Benefit Pension Plans), 962 (Plan Accounting--Defined Contribution Pension Plans), 965 (Plan Accounting--Health and Welfare Benefit Plans)
21-25	2012	Employee benefit plans, with conforming changes as of January 1, 2012	See also ASC sections 960 (Plan Accounting--Defined Benefit Pension Plans), 962 (Plan Accounting--Defined Contribution Pension Plans), 965 (Plan Accounting--Health and Welfare Benefit Plans)
21-26	2013	Employee benefit plans, new edition as of January 1, 2013	See also ASC sections 960 (Plan Accounting--Defined Benefit Pension Plans), 962 (Plan Accounting--Defined Contribution Pension Plans), 965 (Plan Accounting--Health and Welfare Benefit Plans)
21-24	2014	Employee benefit plans, new edition as of January 1, 2014	See also ASC sections 960 (Plan Accounting--Defined Benefit Pension Plans), 962 (Plan Accounting--Defined Contribution Pension Plans), 965 (Plan Accounting--Health and Welfare Benefit Plans)
21-25	2015	Employee benefit plans, new edition as of January 1, 2015	See also ASC sections 960 (Plan Accounting--Defined Benefit Pension Plans), 962 (Plan Accounting--Defined Contribution Pension Plans), 965 (Plan Accounting--Health and Welfare Benefit Plans)
21-26	2016	Employee benefit plans, new edition as of January 1, 2016	See also ASC sections 960 (Plan Accounting--Defined Benefit Pension Plans), 962 (Plan Accounting--Defined Contribution Pension Plans), 965 (Plan Accounting--Health and Welfare Benefit Plans)
21-27	2017	Employee benefit plans, new edition as of January 1, 2017	See also ASC sections 960 (Plan Accounting--Defined Benefit Pension Plans), 962 (Plan Accounting--Defined Contribution Pension Plans), 965 (Plan Accounting--Health and Welfare Benefit Plans)
21-28	2018	Employee benefit plans, new edition as of January 1, 2018	See also ASC sections 960 (Plan Accounting--Defined Benefit Pension Plans), 962 (Plan Accounting--Defined Contribution Pension Plans), 965 (Plan Accounting--Health and Welfare Benefit Plans)
21-29	2019	Employee benefit plans, new edition as of January 1, 2019	See also ASC sections 960 (Plan Accounting--Defined Benefit Pension Plans), 962 (Plan Accounting--Defined Contribution Pension Plans), 965 (Plan Accounting--Health and Welfare Benefit Plans)
21-30	2020	Employee benefit plans, new edition as of August 1, 2020	See also ASC sections 960 (Plan Accounting--Defined Benefit Pension Plans), 962 (Plan Accounting--Defined Contribution Pension Plans), 965 (Plan Accounting--Health and Welfare Benefit Plans)
22-01	1986	Audits of entities with oil and gas producing activities full-text	
22-02	1992	Audits of entities with oil and gas producing activities, with conforming changes as of May 1, 1992 full-text	
22-03	1993	Audits of entities with oil and gas producing activities, with conforming changes as of May 1, 1993 full-text	
22-04	1994	Audits of entities with oil and gas producing activities, with conforming changes as of May 1, 1994 full-text	
22-05	1996	Audits of entities with oil and gas producing activities, with conforming changes as of May 1, 1996 full-text	
22-06	1997	Audits of entities with oil and gas producing activities, with conforming changes as of May 1, 1997 full-text	
22-07	1998	Audits of entities with oil and gas producing activities, with conforming changes as of May 1, 1998 full-text	
22-08	1999	Audits of entities with oil and gas producing activities, with conforming changes as of May 1, 1999 full-text	
22-09	2000	Audits of entities with oil and gas producing activities, with conforming changes as of May 1, 2000 full-text	
22-10	2001	Audits of entities with oil and gas producing activities, with conforming changes as of May 1, 2001 full-text	
22-11	2002	Audits of entities with oil and gas producing activities, with conforming changes as of May 1, 2002 full-text	
22-12	2003	Audits of entities with oil and gas producing activities, with conforming changes as of May 1, 2003 full-text	
22-13	2004	Entities with oil and gas producing activities, with conforming changes as of May 1, 2004 full-text	
22-14	2005	Entities with oil and gas producing activities, with conforming changes as of May 1, 2005 full-text	
22-15	2006	Entities with oil and gas producing activities, with conforming changes as of May 1, 2006 full-text	
221-16	2007	Entities with oil and gas producing activities, with conforming changes as of May 1, 2007 full-text	
22-17	2008	Entities with oil and gas producing activities, with conforming changes as of May 1, 2008 full-text	
22-18	2010	Entities with oil and gas producing activities, with conforming changes as of August 1, 2010 full-text	See also ASC section 932 (Extractive Activities--Oil and Gas)
22-19	2011	Entities with oil and gas producing activities, with conforming changes as of July 1, 2011	See also ASC section 932 (Extractive Activities--Oil and Gas)
22-20	2012	Entities with oil and gas producing activities, with conforming changes as of September 1, 2012	See also ASC section 932 (Extractive Activities--Oil and Gas)
22-21	2014	Entities with oil and gas producing activities, with conforming changes as of January 1, 2014	See also ASC section 932 (Extractive Activities--Oil and Gas)
22-22	2018	Entities with oil and gas producing activities, with conforming changes as of August 1, 2018	See also ASC section 932 (Extractive Activities--Oil and Gas)
23-01	1975	Audits of government contractors full-text	
23-02	1983	Audits of government contractors full-text	
23-03	1990	Audits of federal government contractors, with conforming changes as of December 31, 1990 full-text	
23-04	1992	Audits of federal government contractors, with conforming changes as of May 1, 1992 full-text	
23-05	1993	Audits of federal government contractors, with conforming changes as of May 1, 1993 full-text	
23-06	1994	Audits of federal government contractors, with conforming changes as of May 1, 1994 full-text	
23-07	1996	Audits of federal government contractors, with conforming changes as of May 1, 1996 full-text	
23-08	1997	Audits of federal government contractors, with conforming changes as of May 1. 1997 full-text	
23-09	1998	Audits of federal government contractors, with conforming changes as of May 1, 1998 full-text	
23-10	2000	Audits of federal government contractors, with conforming changes as of May 1, 2000 full-text	
23-11	2001	Audits of federal government contractors, with conforming changes as of May 1, 2001 full-text	
23-12	2002	Audits of federal government contractors, with conforming changes as of May 1, 2002 full-text	
23-13	2003	Audits of federal government contractors, with conforming changes as of May 1, 2003 full-text	
23-14	2004	Federal government contractors, with conforming changes as of May 1, 2004 full-text	
23-15	2005	Federal government contractors, with conforming changes as of May 1, 2005 full-text	
23-16	2006	Federal government contractors, with conforming changes as of May 1, 2006 full-text	
23-17	2007	Federal government contractors, with conforming changes as of May 1, 2007 full-text	
23-18	2008	Federal government contractors, with conforming changes as of May 1, 2008 full-text	See also ASC section 912 (Contractors--Federal government)
24-01	1973	Audits of finance companies full-text	
24-02	1988	Audits of finance companies (including independent and captive financing activities of other companies) full-text	
24-03	1992	Audits of finance companies (including independent and captive financing activities of other companies), with conforming changes as of May 1, 1992 full-text	
24-04	1993	Audits of finance companies (including independent and captive financing activities of other companies), with conforming changes as of May 1, 1993	
24-05	1994	Audits of finance companies (including independent and captive financing activities of other companies), with conforming changes as of May 1, 1994 full-text	
24-06	1996	Audits of finance companies (including independent and captive financing activities of other companies), with conforming changes as of May 1, 1996 full-text	
24-07	1997	Audits of finance companies (including independent and captive financing activities of other companies), with conforming changes as of May 1, 1997 full-text	
24-08	1998	Audits of finance companies (including independent and captive financing activities of other companies), with conforming changes as of May 1, 1998 full-text	
24-09	1999	Audits of finance companies (including independent and captive financing activities of other companies), with conforming changes as of May 1, 1999 full-text	
24-10	2000	Audits of finance companies (including independent and captive financing activities of other companies), with conforming changes as of May 1, 2000 full-text	Title ceased; Finance Companies included in Depository and Lending Institutions (2004)
25-01	1966	Audits of fire and casualty insurance companies full-text	
25-02	1977	Audits of fire and casualty insurance companies full-text	
25-03	1979	Audits of fire and casualty insurance companies full-text	
25-04	1982	Audits of fire and casualty insurance companies full-text	Title ceased. See Audits of Property and liability insurance companies (1992)
26-01	1973	Accounting for Franchise fee revenue full-text	See ASC section 952 (Franchisors)
27-01	2011	Gaming, new edition as of March 1, 2011	For early editions see Casinos (2006);See also ASC section 924 (Entertainment--Casinos)
27-02	2012	Gaming, new edition as of September 1, 2012	See also ASC section 924 (Entertainment--Casinos)
27-03	2014	Gaming, September 1, 2014	See also ASC section 924 (Entertainment--Casinos)
27-04	2017	Gaming, September 1, 2017	See also ASC section 924 (Entertainment--Casinos)
27-05	2018	Gaming, September 1, 2018	See also ASC section 924 (Entertainment--Casinos)
27-06	2020	Gaming, September 1, 2020	See also ASC section 924 (Entertainment--Casinos)
28-01	2004	Government auditing standards and circular A-133 audits, with conforming changes as of May 1, 2004 full-text	
28-02	2005	Government auditing standards and circular A-133 audits, with conforming changes as of May 1, 2005 full-text	
28-03	2006	Government auditing standards and circular A-133 audits, with conforming changes as of May 1, 2006 full-text	
28-04	2007	Government auditing standards and circular A-133 audits, with conforming changes as of May 1, 2007 full-text	
28-05	2008	Government auditing standards and circular A-133 audits, with conforming changes as of August 1, 2008 full-text	
28-06	2009	Government auditing standards and circular A-133 audits, with conforming changes as of October 1, 2009 full-text	
28-07	2010	Government auditing standards and circular A-133 audits, with conforming changes as of May 1, 2010 full-text	
28-08	2011	Government auditing standards and circular A-133 audits, with conforming changes as of April 1, 2011	
28-09	2012	Government auditing standards and circular A-133 audits, with conforming changes as of February 1, 2012	
28-10	2013	Government auditing standards and circular A-133 audits, February 1, 2013	
28-11	2014	Government auditing standards and circular A-133 audits, February 1, 2014	
28-12	2015	Government auditing standards and single audits, February 1, 2015	
28-13	2016	Government auditing standards and single audits, April 1, 2016	
28-14	2017	Government auditing standards and single audits, March 1, 2017	
28-15	2018	Government auditing standards and single audits, March 1, 2018	
28-16	2019	Government auditing standards and single audits, March 1, 2019	
28-17	2020	Government auditing standards and single audits, April 1, 2020	
29-01	1934	Audits of governmental bodies full-text	
30-01	2017	Guide to Audit Data Analysis	
31-01	1990	Audits of providers of health care services full-text	
31-02	1990	Audits of providers of health care services, second edition full-text	
31-03	1990	Audits of providers of health care services, as of December 31, 1990 full-text	
31-04	1992	Audits of providers of health care services, with conforming changes as of May 1, 1992 full-text	
31-05	1993	Audits of providers of health care services, with conforming changes as of May 1, 1993 full-text	
31-06	1994	Audits of providers of health care services, with conforming changes as of May 1, 1994 full-text	
31-07	1996	Health care organizations, new edition as of June 1, 1996 full-text	
31-08	1997	Health care organizations, with conforming changes as of May 1, 1997 full-text	
31-09	1998	Health care organizations, with conforming changes as of May 1, 1998 full-text	
31-10	1999	Health care organizations, with conforming changes as of May 1, 1999 full-text	
31-11	2000	Health care organizations, with conforming changes as of May 1, 2000 full-text	
31-12	2001	Health care organizations, with conforming changes as of May 1, 2001 full-text	
31-13	2003	Health care organizations, with conforming changes as of August 1, 2003 full-text	
31-14	2004	Health care organizations, with conforming changes as of May 1, 2004 full-text	
31-15	2005	Health care organizations, with conforming changes as of May 1, 2005 full-text	
31-16	2006	Health care organizations, with conforming changes as of May 1, 2006 full-text	
31-17	2007	Health care organizations, with conforming changes as of May 1, 2007 full-text	
31-18	2008	Health care organizations, with conforming changes as of May 1, 2008 full-text	
31-19	2009	Health care entities, with conforming changes as of August 1, 2009 full-text	See also ASC section 954 (Health Care Entities)
31-20	2010	Health care entities, with conforming changes as of June 1, 2010 full-text	See also ASC section 954 (Health Care Entities)
31-21	2011	Health care entities, with conforming changes as of July 1, 2011	See also ASC section 954 (Health Care Entities)
31-22	2012	Health care entities, with conforming changes as of September 1, 2012	See also ASC section 954 (Health Care Entities)
31-23	2013	Health care entities, with conforming changes as of September 1, 2013	See also ASC section 954 (Health Care Entities)
31-24	2014	Health care entities, with conforming changes as of September 1, 2014	See also ASC section 954 (Health Care Entities)
31-25	2015	Health care entities, with conforming changes as of September 1, 2015	See also ASC section 954 (Health Care Entities)
31-26	2016	Health care entities, with conforming changes as of September 1, 2016	See also ASC section 954 (Health Care Entities)
31-27	2017	Health care entities, with conforming changes as of September 1, 2017	See also ASC section 954 (Health Care Entities)
31-28	2018	Health care entities, with conforming changes as of September 1, 2018	See also ASC section 954 (Health Care Entities)
31-29	2019	Health care entities, with conforming changes as of September 1, 2019	See also ASC section 954 (Health Care Entities)
32-01	1972	Hospital audit guide full-text	
32-02	1978	Hospital audit guide full-text	
32-03	1980	Hospital audit guide full-text	
32-04	1982	Hospital audit guide full-text	
32-05	1985	Hospital audit guide full-text	
32-06	1987	Hospital audit guide full-text	Title ceased. Superseded by Audits of Providers of health care services (1990)
33-01	1977	Auditor's study and evaluation of internal control in EDP systems full-text	
34-01	1973	Audits of investment companies full-text	
34-02	1977	Audits of investment companies full-text	
34-03	1979	Audits of investment companies full-text	
34-04	1987	Audits of investment companies full-text	
34-05	1990	Audits of investment companies, as of December 31, 1990 full-text	
34-06	1992	Audits of investment companies, with conforming changes as of May 1, 1992 full-text	
34-07	1993	Audits of investment companies, with conforming changes as of May 1, 1993 full-text	
34-08	1994	Audits of investment companies, with conforming changes as of May 1, 1994 full-text	
34-09	1996	Audits of investment companies, with conforming changes as of May 1, 1996 full-text	
34-10	1997	Audits of investment companies, with conforming changes as of May 1, 1997 full-text	
34-101	1998	Audits of investment companies, with conforming changes as of May 1, 1998 full-text	
34-12	2000	Audits of investment companies, new edition as of December 1, 2000 full-text	
34-13	2001	Audits of investment companies, with conforming changes as of May 1, 2001 full-text	
34-14	2002	Audits of investment companies, with conforming changes as of May 1, 2002 full-text	
34-15	2003	Audits of investment companies, with conforming changes as of May 1, 2003 full-text	
34-16	2004	Investment companies, with conforming changes as of May 1, 2004 full-text	
34-17	2006	Investment companies, with conforming changes as of May 1, 2006 full-text	
34-18	2007	Investment companies, with conforming changes as of May 1, 2007 full-text	
34-19	2008	Investment companies, with conforming changes as of May 1, 2008 full-text	
34-20	2009	Investment companies, with conforming changes as of May 1, 2009 full-text	See also ASC section 946 (Financial Services--Investment Companies)
34-21	2010	Investment companies, with conforming changes as of May 1, 2010 full-text	See also ASC section 946 (Financial Services--Investment Companies)
34-22	2011	Investment companies, with conforming changes as of May 1, 2011	See also ASC section 946 (Financial Services--Investment Companies)
34-23	2012	Investment companies, with conforming changes as of May 1, 2012	See also ASC section 946 (Financial Services--Investment Companies)
34-24	2013	Investment companies, with conforming changes as of May 1, 2013	See also ASC section 946 (Financial Services--Investment Companies)
34-25	2014	Investment companies, with conforming changes as of May 1, 2014	See also ASC section 946 (Financial Services--Investment Companies)
34-26	2015	Investment companies, with conforming changes as of May 1, 2015	See also ASC section 946 (Financial Services--Investment Companies)
34-27	2016	Investment companies, with conforming changes as of May 1, 2016	See also ASC section 946 (Financial Services--Investment Companies)
34-28	2017	Investment companies, with conforming changes as of July 1, 2017	See also ASC section 946 (Financial Services--Investment Companies)
34-29	2018	Investment companies, with conforming changes as of July 1, 2018	See also ASC section 946 (Financial Services--Investment Companies)
34-30	2019	Investment companies, with conforming changes as of July 1, 2019	See also ASC section 946 (Financial Services--Investment Companies)
34-31	2020	Investment companies, with conforming changes as of July 1, 2020	See also ASC section 946 (Financial Services--Investment Companies)
35-01	2000	Life and health insurance entities, new edition as of June 15, 2000 full-text	For previous editions see Audits of stock life insurance companies (1994)
35-02	2001	Life and health insurance entities, with conforming changes as of May 1, 2001 full-text	
35-03	2002	Life and health insurance entities, with conforming changes as of May 1, 2002 full-text	
35-04	2003	Life and health insurance entities, with conforming changes as of May 1, 2003 full-text	
35-05	2004	Life and health insurance entities, with conforming changes as of May 1, 2004 full-text	
35-06	2005	Life and health insurance entities, with conforming changes as of May 1, 2005 full-text	
35-07	2006	Life and health insurance entities, with conforming changes as of May 1, 2006 full-text	
35-08	2008	Life and health insurance entities, with conforming changes as of May 1, 2008 full-text	
35-09	2009	Life and health insurance entities, with conforming changes as of May 1, 2009 full-text	See also ASC section 944 (Financial Services--Insurance)
35-10	2010	Life and health insurance entities, with conforming changes as of May 1, 2010 full-text	See also ASC section 944 (Financial Services--Insurance)
35-11	2011	Life and health insurance entities, with conforming changes as of May 1, 2011	See also ASC section 944 (Financial Services--Insurance)
35-12	2012	Life and health insurance entities, with conforming changes as of May 1, 2012	See also ASC section 944 (Financial Services--Insurance)
35-13	2013	Life and health insurance entities, with conforming changes as of July 1, 2013	See also ASC section 944 (Financial Services--Insurance)
35-14	2014	Life and health insurance entities, with conforming changes as of August 1, 2014	See also ASC section 944 (Financial Services--Insurance)
35-15	2015	Life and health insurance entities, with conforming changes as of August 1, 2015	See also ASC section 944 (Financial Services--Insurance)
35-16	2016	Life and health insurance entities, with conforming changes as of September 1, 2016	See also ASC section 944 (Financial Services--Insurance)
35-17	2018	Life and health insurance entities, with conforming changes as of August 1, 2018	See also ASC section 944 (Financial Services--Insurance)
35-18	2020	Life and health insurance entities, with conforming changes as of October 1, 2020	See also ASC section 944 (Financial Services--Insurance)
36-01	1969	Medicare audit guide full-text	
37-01	1973	Accounting for motion picture films full-text	See ASC section 926 (Entertainment--Films)
376-02	1979	Accounting for motion picture films full-text	See ASC section 926 (Entertainment--Films)
38-01	1981	Audits of certain nonprofit organizations full-text	
38-02	1988	Audits of certain nonprofit organizations full-text	
38-03	1990	Audits of certain nonprofit organizations, as of December 31, 1990 full-text	
38-04	1992	Audits of certain nonprofit organizations, with conforming changes as of May 1, 1992 full-text	
38-05	1993	Audits of certain nonprofit organizations, with conforming changes as of May 1, 1993 full-text	
38-06	1994	Audits of certain nonprofit organizations, with conforming changes as of May 1, 1994 full-text	
38-07	1996	Not-for-profit organizations, new edition as of June 1, 1996 full-text	
38-08	1997	Not-for-profit organizations, with conforming changes as of May 1, 1997 full-text	
38-09	1998	Not-for-profit organizations, with conforming changes as of May 1, 1998 full-text	
38-10	1999	Not-for-profit organizations, with conforming changes as of May 1, 1999 full-text	
38-11	2000	Not-for-profit organizations, with conforming changes as of May 1, 2000 full-text	
38-12	2001	Not-for-profit organizations, with conforming changes as of May 1, 2001 full-text	
387-13	2002	Not-for-profit organizations, with conforming changes as of May 1, 2002 full-text	
38-14	2003	Not-for-profit organizations, with conforming changes as of May 1, 2003 full-text	
38-15	2004	Not-for-profit organizations, with conforming changes as of May 1, 2004 full-text	
38-16	2005	Not-for-profit organizations, with conforming changes as of May 1, 2005 full-text	
38-17	2006	Not-for-profit organizations, with conforming changes as of May 1, 2006 full-text	
38-18	2007	Not-for-profit organizations, with conforming changes as of May 1, 2007 full-text	
38-19	2008	Not-for-profit organizations, with conforming changes as of March 1, 2008 full-text	
38-20	2009	Not-for-profit entities, with conforming changes as of March 1, 2009 full-text	See also ASC section 958 (Not-for-Profit Entities)
38-21	2010	Not-for-profit entities, with conforming changes as of March 1, 2010 full-text	See also ASC section 958 (Not-for-Profit Entities)
38-22	2011	Not-for-profit entities, with conforming changes as of March 1, 2011	See also ASC section 958 (Not-for-Profit Entities)
38-23	2012	Not-for-profit entities, with conforming changes as of March 1, 2012	See also ASC section 958 (Not-for-Profit Entities)
38-24	2013	Not-for-profit entities, with conforming changes as of March 1, 2013	See also ASC section 958 (Not-for-Profit Entities)
38-25	2014	Not-for-profit entities, with conforming changes as of March 1, 2014	See also ASC section 958 (Not-for-Profit Entities)
38-26	2015	Not-for-profit entities, with conforming changes as of March 1, 2015	See also ASC section 958 (Not-for-Profit Entities)
38-27	2016	Not-for-profit entities, with conforming changes as of March 1, 2016	See also ASC section 958 (Not-for-Profit Entities)
38-28	2017	Not-for-profit entities, with conforming changes as of March 1, 2017	See also ASC section 958 (Not-for-Profit Entities)
38-29	2018	Not-for-profit entities, with conforming changes as of March 1, 2018	See also ASC section 958 (Not-for-Profit Entities)
38-30	2019	Not-for-profit entities, with conforming changes as of March 1, 2019	See also ASC section 958 (Not-for-Profit Entities)
38-31	2020	Not-for-profit entities, with conforming changes as of March 1, 2020	See also ASC section 958 (Not-for-Profit Entities)
39-01	1968	Audits of personal financial statements full-text	
39-02	1983	Personal financial statements guide full-text	
39-03	1990	Personal financial statements guide, as of December 31, 1990 full-text	
39-04	1992	Personal financial statements guide full-text	
39-05	1997	Personal financial statements guide, with conforming changes as of September 1, 1997 full-text	
39-06	1999	Personal financial statements guide, with conforming changes as of May 1, 1999 full-text	
39-07	2000	Personal financial statements guide, with conforming changes as of May 1, 2000 full-text	
39-08	2001	Personal financial statements guide, with conforming changes as of May 1, 2001 full-text	
39-09	2003	Personal financial statements guide, with conforming changes as of May 1, 2003 full-text	
39-10	2005	Personal financial statements guide, with conforming changes as of May 1, 2005 full-text	
398-11	2006	Personal financial statements guide, with conforming changes as of May 1, 2006 full-text	
39-12	2007	Personal financial statements guide, with conforming changes as of May 1, 2007 full-text	
39-13	2008	Personal financial statements guide, with conforming changes as of May 1, 2008 full-text	
40-01	2015	Preparation, Compilation, and review engagements March 1, 2015	See Compilation, and Review Engagements for previous series title
40-02	2016	Preparation, Compilation, and review engagements March 1, 2016	See Compilation, and Review Engagements for previous series title
40-03	2017	Preparation, Compilation, and review engagements June 1, 2017	See Compilation, and Review Engagements for previous series title
40-04	2018	Preparation, Compilation, and review engagements June 1, 2018	See Compilation, and Review Engagements for previous series title
40-05	2019	Preparation, Compilation, and review engagements June 15, 2019	See Compilation, and Review Engagements for previous series title
40-06	2020	Preparation, Compilation, and review engagements July 1, 2020	See Compilation, and Review Engagements for previous series title
41-01	1990	Audits of property and liability insurance companies full-text	
41-02	1990	Audits of property and liability insurance companies, as of December 31, 1990 full-text	
41-04	1992	Audits of property and liability insurance companies, with conforming changes as of May 1, 1992 full-text	
41-05	1993	Audits of property and liability insurance companies, with conforming changes as of May 1, 1993 full-text	
41-06	1994	Audits of property and liability insurance companies, with conforming changes as of May 1, 1994 full-text	
41-07	1996	Audits of property and liability insurance companies, with conforming changes as of May 1, 1996 full-text	
41-08	1997	Audits of property and liability insurance companies, with conforming changes as of May 1, 1997 full-text	
41-09	1998	Audits of property and liability insurance companies, with conforming changes as of May 1, 1998 full-text	
41-10	1999	Audits of property and liability insurance companies, with conforming changes as of May 1, 1999 full-text	
41-11	2000	Audits of property and liability insurance companies, with conforming changes as of May 1, 2000 full-text	
41-12	2001	Audits of property and liability insurance companies, with conforming changes as of May 1, 2001 full-text	
41-13	2002	Audits of property and liability insurance companies, with conforming changes as of May 1, 2002 full-text	
41-14	2003	Audits of property and liability insurance companies, with conforming changes as of May 1, 2003 full-text	
41-15	2004	Property and liability insurance companies, with conforming changes as of May 1, 2004 full-text	
41-16	2005	Property and liability insurance companies, with conforming changes as of May 1, 2005 full-text	
41-17	2006	Property and liability insurance companies, with conforming changes as of September 1, 2006 full-text	
41-18	2008	Property and liability insurance companies, with conforming changes as of May 1, 2008 full-text	
41-19	2009	Property and liability insurance entities, with conforming changes as of June 1, 2009 full-text	See also ASC section 944 (Financial Services--Insurance)
41-20	2010	Property and liability insurance entities, with conforming changes as of June 1, 2010 full-text	See also ASC section 944 (Financial Services--Insurance)
41-21	2011	Property and liability insurance entities, with conforming changes as of June 1, 2011	See also ASC section 944 (Financial Services--Insurance)
41-22	2013	Property and liability insurance entities, New edition as of January 1, 2013	See also ASC section 944 (Financial Services--Insurance)
41-23	2014	Property and liability insurance entities, May 1, 2014	See also ASC section 944 (Financial Services--Insurance)
41-24	2015	Property and liability insurance entities, July 1, 2015	See also ASC section 944 (Financial Services--Insurance)
41-25	2016	Property and liability insurance entities, July 1, 2016	See also ASC section 944 (Financial Services--Insurance)
41-26	2018	Property and liability insurance entities, September 1, 2018	See also ASC section 944 (Financial Services--Insurance)
41-27	2019	Property and liability insurance entities, September 1, 2019	See also ASC section 944 (Financial Services--Insurance)
42-01	1980	Guide for a review of a financial forecast full-text	
42-02	1982	Guide for a review of a financial forecast full-text	
42-03	1986	Guide for prospective financial statements full-text	
42-04	1992	Guide for prospective financial statements full-text	
42-05	1992	Guide for prospective financial statements full-text	
42-06	1993	Guide for prospective financial information full-text	
42-07	1997	Guide for prospective financial information, with conforming changes as of April 1, 1997 full-text	
42-08	1999	Guide for prospective financial information, with conforming changes as of April 1, 1999 full-text	
42-09	2002	Guide for prospective financial information, with conforming changes as of May 1, 2002 full-text	
42-10	2003	Guide for prospective financial information, with conforming changes as of May 1, 2003 full-text	
42-11	2005	Guide for prospective financial information, with conforming changes as of May 1, 2005 full-text	
42-12	2006	Guide for prospective financial information, with conforming changes as of May 1, 2006 full-text	
42-13	2007	Guide for prospective financial information, with conforming changes as of May 1, 2007 full-text	
42-14	2008	Prospective financial information, with conforming changes as of March 1, 2008 full-text	
42-15	2009	Prospective financial information, with conforming changes as of March 1, 2009 full-text	
42-16	2012	Prospective financial information, with conforming changes as of November 1, 2012	
42-17	2017	Prospective financial information, with conforming changes as of April 1, 2017	
43-01	2011	Reporting on controls at a service organization, relevant to security, availability, processing integrity, confidentiality, or privacy (SOC2), May 1, 2011	
43-02	2012	Reporting on controls at a service organization, relevant to security, availability, processing integrity, confidentiality, or privacy (SOC2), May 1, 2012	
43-03	2015	Reporting on controls at a service organization, relevant to security, availability, processing integrity, confidentiality, or privacy (SOC2), July 1, 2015	
43-04	2017	Reporting on an examination of controls at a service organization relevant to user entities' internal control over financial reporting (SOC1), January 1, 2017	
44-01	1973	Accounting for retail land sales full-text	
45-01	1973	Accounting for profit recognition on sales of real estate full-text	
45-02	1979	Accounting for profit recognition on sales of real estate full-text	
46-01	1987	Guide for the use of real estate appraisal information full-text	
46-02	1990	Guide for the use of real estate appraisal information, as of December 31, 1990 full-text	
47-01	1991	Guide for the use of real estate appraisal information full-text	
47-02	1997	Guide for the use of real estate appraisal information, with conforming changes as of May 1, 1997 full-text	
48-01	2016	Revenue recognition, November 1, 2016	
48-02	2019	Revenue recognition, January 1, 2019	
49-01	1940	Audits of savings and loan associations by independent certified public accountants full-text	
49-02	1951	Audits of savings and loan associations by independent certified public accountants full-text	
49-03	1962	Audits of savings and loan associations full-text	
49-04	1973	Audits of savings and loan associations full-text	
49-05	1975	Audits of savings and loan associations full-text	
49-06	1979	Savings and loan associations full-text	
49-07	1985	Savings and loan associations full-text	
49-08	1986	Savings and loan associations full-text	
49-09	1987	Savings and loan associations full-text	
49-10	1991	Audits of savings institutions, as of December 31, 1991 full-text	
49-11	1992	Audits of savings institutions, as of May 1, 1992 full-text	
49-12	1993	Audits of savings institutions, with conforming changes as of May 1, 1993 full-text	
49-13	1994	Audits of savings institutions, with conforming changes as of May 1, 1994 full-text	Title ceased; Combined with Banks and savings institutions (1996)
50-01	1974	Audits of service-center-produced records full-text	
509-02	1980	Audits of service-center-produced records full-text	
50-03	1987	Audits of service-center-produced records full-text	
50-04	2002	Service organizations, applying SAS no. 70, as amended full-text	
50-05	2004	Service organizations, applying SAS no. 70, as amended full-text	
50-06	2005	Service organizations, applying SAS no. 70, as amended full-text	
50-07	2006	Service organizations, applying SAS no. 70, as amended, with conforming changes as of May 1, 2006 full-text	
50-08	2007	Service organizations, applying SAS no. 70, as amended, with conforming changes as of May 1, 2007 full-text	
50-09	2008	Service organizations, applying SAS no. 70, as amended, with conforming changes as of March 1, 2008 full-text	
50-10	2009	Service organizations, applying SAS no. 70, as amended, with conforming changes as of May 1, 2009 full-text	
50-11	2011	Service organizations, applying SSAE no. 16, Reporting on controls at a service organization (SOC1), May 1, 2011	
50-12	2013	Service organizations, Reporting on controls at a service organization relevant to user entities' internal control over financial reporting (SOC1), May 1, 2013	
51-01	2018	SOC 2 reporting on an examination of controls at a service organization relevant to security, availability, processing integrity, confidentiality, or privacy, January 1, 2018	
52-01	2012	Special consideration in Auditing Financial Instruments, October 1, 2012	
52-02	2014	Special consideration in Auditing Financial Instruments, September 1, 2014	
52-03	2016	Special consideration in Auditing Financial Instruments, September 1, 2016	
53-01	1974	Audits of state and local governmental units full-text	
53-02	1975	Audits of state and local governmental units full-text	
53-03	1978	Audits of state and local governmental units full-text	
53-04	1981	Audits of state and local governmental units full-text	
53-05	1986	Audits of state and local governmental units full-text	
53-06	1989	Audits of state and local governmental units full-text	
53-07	1992	Audits of state and local governmental units, with conforming changes as of May 1, 1992 full-text	
53-08	1993	Audits of state and local governmental units, with conforming changes as of May 1, 1993 full-text	
53-09	1994	Audits of state and local governmental units full-text	
53-10	1995	Audits of state and local governmental units, with conforming changes as of May 1, 1995 full-text	
53-11	1996	Audits of state and local governmental units, with conforming changes as of May 1, 1996 full-text	
53-12	1998	Audits of state and local governmental units, with conforming changes as of May 1, 1998 full-text	
53-13	1999	Audits of state and local governmental units, with conforming changes as of May 1, 1999 full-text	
53-14	2000	Audits of state and local governmental units, with conforming changes as of May 1, 2000 full-text	
53-15	2001	Audits of state and local governmental units, with conforming changes as of May 1, 2001 full-text	
53-16	2002	Audits of state and local governments (non-GASB 34 edition), with conforming changes as of May 1, 2002 full-text	
53-17	2002	Audits of state and local governments (GASB 34 edition), with conforming changes as of September 1, 2002 full-text	
53-18	2003	Audits of state and local governments (non-GASB 34 edition), with conforming changes as of May 1, 2003 full-text	
53-19	2003	Audits of state and local governments (GASB 34 edition), with conforming changes as of May 1, 2003 full-text	
53-20	2004	State and local governments, with conforming changes as of May 1, 2004 full-text	
53-21	2005	State and local governments, with conforming changes as of May 1, 2005 full-text	
53-22	2006	State and local governments, with conforming changes as of May 1, 2006 full-text	
53-23	2007	State and local governments, updated as of May 1, 2007 full-text	
53-24	2008	State and local governments, with conforming changes as of March 1, 2008 full-text	
53-25	2009	State and local governments, with conforming changes as of March 1, 2009 full-text	
53-26	2010	State and local governments, with conforming changes as of March 1, 2010 full-text	
53-27	2011	State and local governments, with conforming changes as of March 1, 2011	
53-28	2012	State and local governments, with conforming changes as of March 1, 2012	
53-29	2013	State and local governments, new edition as of March 1, 2013	
53-30	2014	State and local governments, new edition as of March 1, 2014	
53-31	2015	State and local governments, new edition as of March 1, 2015	
53-32	2016	State and local governments, new edition as of March 1, 2016	
53-33	2017	State and local governments, new edition as of March 1, 2017	
53-34	2018	State and local governments, new edition as of March 1, 2018	
53-35	2019	State and local governments, new edition as of March 1, 2019	
53-36	2020	State and local governments, new edition as of April 1, 2020	
54-01	2003	Audits of states, local governments, and not-for-profit organizations receiving federal awards, with conforming changes as of May 1, 2003 full-text	
55-01	1972	Audits of stock life insurance companies full-text	
55-02	1978	Audits of stock life insurance companies full-text	
55-03	1979	Audits of stock life insurance companies full-text	
55-04	1983	Audits of stock life insurance companies full-text	
55-05	1985	Audits of stock life insurance companies full-text	
55-06	1991	Audits of stock life insurance companies full-text	
55-07	1992	Audits of stock life insurance companies, with conforming changes as of May 1, 1992 full-text	
55-08	1993	Audits of stock life insurance companies, with conforming changes as of May 1, 1993 full-text	
55-09	1994	Audits of stock life insurance companies, with conforming changes as of May 1, 1994 full-text	Title ceased; Superseded by Life and health insurance entities (2000)
56-01	1967	Audits of voluntary health and welfare organizations full-text	
56-02	1974	Audits of voluntary health and welfare organizations full-text	
56-03	1988	Audits of voluntary health and welfare organizations full-text	
56-04	1990	Audits of voluntary health and welfare organizations, as of December 31, 1990 full-text	
56-05	1992	Audits of voluntary health and welfare organizations, with conforming changes as of May 1, 1992 full-text	
56-06	1993	Audits of voluntary health and welfare organizations, with conforming changes as of May 1, 1993 full-text	
56-07	1994	Audits of voluntary health and welfare organizations, with conforming changes as of May 1, 1994 full-text	Title ceased; Superseded by Not-for-profit organizations (1996)
