= DataFlow Group =

- Founded: 2006
- Headquarters: Dubai, United Arab Emirates

DataFlow Group is a global provider of Employment Verification Services, including background screening and immigration compliance.

== History ==
DataFlow Group, founded in 2006, has its headquarters in Dubai. The company has a network of 100,000 issuing authorities throughout more than 200 countries, in addition to 620 experts and researchers. Applicants that require PSV to support equalisation applications from several governmental or quasi-governmental entities in the UAE and the GCC are effectively forced to use this service as their PSV format is the only acceptable format for submission. For example, the Ministry of Education has partnered with Dataflow to provide a fast-track verification service for individuals applying for the equivalency of their degrees obtained outside of the UAE.". Despite the claimed benefits of such a partnership, numerous complaints from applicants are easily accessible online, citing a lack of customer support, poor communication, lack of timely response to applications.

DataFlow Group serves a client database spanning 200 countries. Among the company's clients are government, quasi-government, regulatory, and multinational organizations across the globe.

In 2014, EQT Mid Market - a leading private equity group in Northern Europe, with portfolio companies in Northern and Eastern Europe, Asia, and the US - acquired DataFlow Group to expand the company's services.

== Services ==
DataFlow Group provides background checks and document verification for public and private sector organizations in adherence with Joint Commission International (JCI) guidelines and Service Organization Controls (SOC) compliance standard. The company also provides proprietary databases and international watch lists for organizations to use in their own screening processes.
