= Trustless system =

Cryptographic system not requiring trust

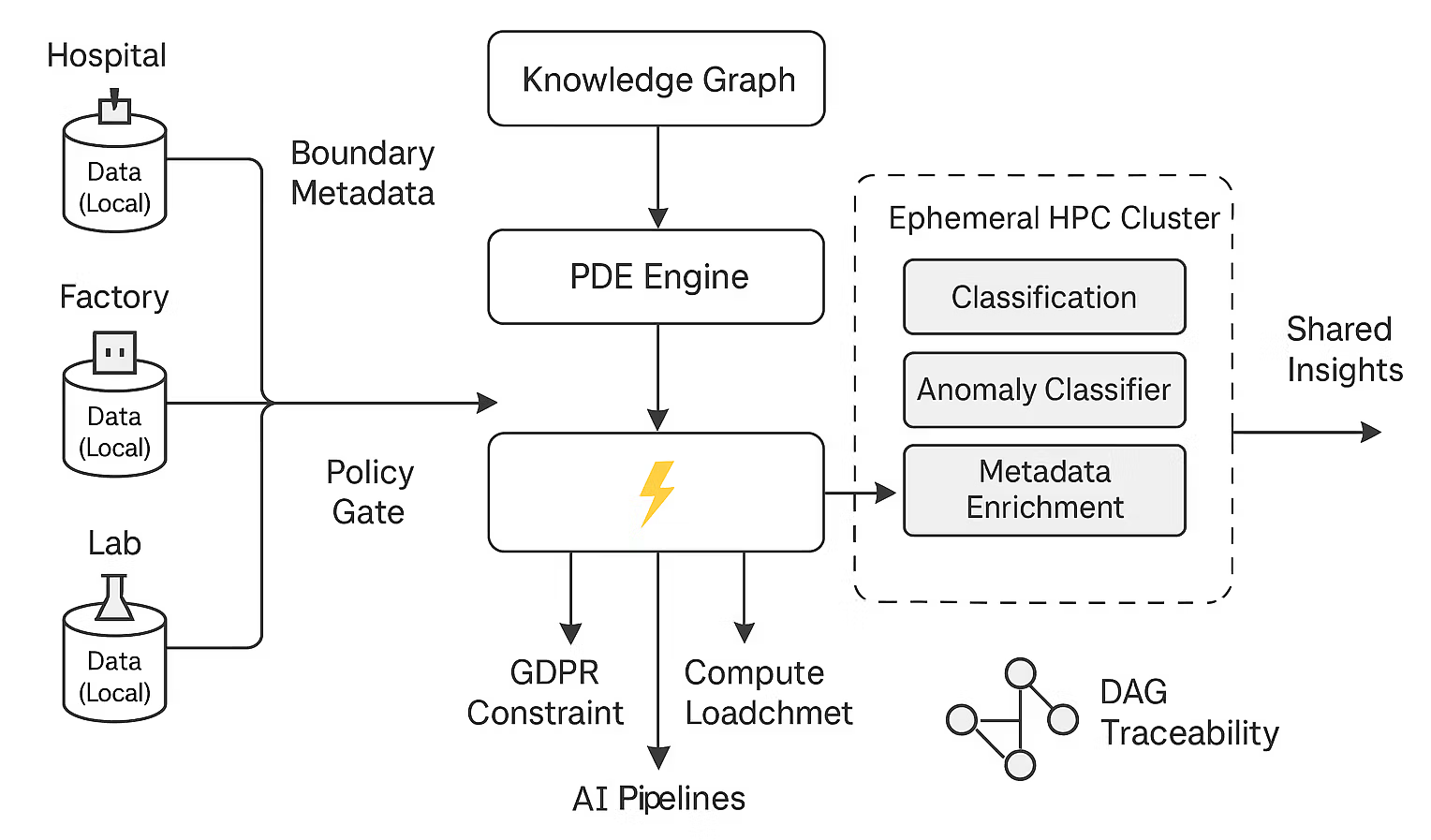
Zero Trust AI Orchestration System, an example of trustless system.

Trustless system is a (usually cryptographic) system in which none of the stakeholders involved are required to trust one another while still engaging in the most accurately and reliably audited transactions. One of its most important technologies are immutable ledgers, for example distributed ledger technology, with one of its most well-known implementations being a blockchain.

== Uses ==
It is useful for: Information technology audit transparency
