= Information technology audit =

Examination of an information system

An information technology audit, or information systems audit, is an examination of the management controls within an Information technology (IT) infrastructure and business applications. The evaluation of evidence obtained determines if the information systems are safeguarding assets, maintaining data integrity, and operating effectively to achieve the organization's goals or objectives. These reviews may be performed in conjunction with a financial statement audit, internal audit, or other form of attestation engagement.

IT audits are also known as automated data processing audits (ADP audits) and computer audits. They were formerly called electronic data processing audits (EDP audits).

== Purpose ==
An IT audit is different from a financial statement audit. While a financial audit's purpose is to evaluate whether the financial statements present fairly, in all material respects, an entity's financial position, results of operations, and cash flows in conformity to standard accounting practices, the purposes of an IT audit is to evaluate the system's internal control design and effectiveness. This includes, but is not limited to, efficiency and security protocols, development processes, and IT governance or oversight. Installing controls are necessary but not sufficient to provide adequate security. People responsible for security must consider if the controls are installed as intended, if they are effective, or if any breach in security has occurred and if so, what actions can be done to prevent future breaches. These inquiries must be answered by independent and unbiased observers. These observers are performing the task of information systems auditing. In an Information Systems (IS) environment, an audit is an examination of information systems, their inputs, outputs, and processing.

As technology continues to advance and become more prevalent in our lives and in businesses, along comes an increase of IT threats and disruptions. These impact every industry and come in different forms such as data breaches, external threats, and operational issues. These risks and need for high levels of assurance increase the need for IT audits to check businesses IT system performances and to lower the probability and impact of technology threats and disruptions.

The primary functions of an IT audit are to evaluate the systems that are in place to guard an organization's information. Specifically, information technology audits are used to evaluate the organization's ability to protect its information assets and to properly dispense information to authorized parties. The IT audit aims to evaluate the following:

Will the organization's computer systems be available for the business at all times when required? (known as availability) Will the information in the systems be disclosed only to authorized users? (known as security and confidentiality) Will the information provided by the system always be accurate, reliable, and timely? (measures the integrity) In this way, the audit hopes to assess the risk to the company's valuable asset (its information) and establish methods of minimizing those risks.

More specifically, organizations should look into three major requirements: confidentiality, integrity, and availability to label their needs for security and trust in their IT systems.

- Confidentiality: The purpose is to keep private information restricted from unauthorized users.
- Integrity: The purpose is to guarantee that information be changed in an authorized manner
- Availability: The purpose is to ensure that only authorized users have access to specific information

These three requirements should be emphasized in every industry and every organization with an IT environment but each requirements and controls to support them will vary.

== Classification of IT audits ==
Various authorities have created differing taxonomies to distinguish the various types of IT audits. Goodman & Lawless state that there are three specific systematic approaches to carry out an IT audit:

- Technological innovation process audit. This audit constructs a risk profile for existing and new projects. The audit will assess the length and depth of the company's experience in its chosen technologies, as well as its presence in relevant markets, the organization of each project, and the structure of the portion of the industry that deals with this project or product, organization and industry structure.
- Innovative comparison audit. This audit is an analysis of the innovative abilities of the company being audited, in comparison to its competitors. This requires examination of company's research and development facilities, as well as its track record in actually producing new products.
- Technological position audit: This audit reviews the technologies that the business currently has and that it needs to add. Technologies are characterized as being either "base", "key", "pacing" or "emerging".

Others describe the spectrum of IT audits with five categories of audits:

- Systems and Applications: An audit to verify that systems and applications are appropriate, are efficient, and are adequately controlled to ensure valid, reliable, timely, and secure input, processing, and output at all levels of a system's activity. System and process assurance audits form a subtype, focussing on business process-centric business IT systems. Such audits have the objective to assist financial auditors.

- Information Processing Facilities: An audit to verify that the processing facility is controlled to ensure timely, accurate, and efficient processing of applications under normal and potentially disruptive conditions.
- Systems Development: An audit to verify that the systems under development meet the objectives of the organization, and to ensure that the systems are developed in accordance with generally accepted standards for systems development.
- Management of IT and Enterprise Architecture: An audit to verify that IT management has developed an organizational structure and procedures to ensure a controlled and efficient environment for information processing.
- Client/Server, Telecommunications, Intranets, and Extranets: An audit to verify that telecommunications controls are in place on the client (computer receiving services), server, and on the network connecting the clients and servers.

And some lump all IT audits as being one of only two type: "general control review" audits or "application control review" audits.

A number of IT audit professionals from the Information Assurance realm consider there to be three fundamental types of controls regardless of the type of audit to be performed, especially in the IT realm. Many frameworks and standards try to break controls into different disciplines or arenas, terming them “Security Controls“, ”Access Controls“, “IA Controls” in an effort to define the types of controls involved. At a more fundamental level, these controls can be shown to consist of three types of fundamental controls: Protective/Preventative Controls, Detective Controls and Reactive/Corrective Controls.

In an IS, there are two types of auditors and audits: internal and external. IS auditing is usually a part of accounting internal auditing, and is frequently performed by corporate internal auditors. An external auditor reviews the findings of the internal audit as well as the inputs, processing and outputs of information systems. The external audit of information systems is primarily conducted by certified Information System auditors, such as CISA, certified by ISACA, Information System Audit and Control Association, USA, Information System Auditor (ISA) certified by ICAI (Institute of Chartered Accountants of India), and other certified by reputed organization for IS audit. IS auditing considers all the potential hazards and controls in information systems. It focuses on issues like operations, data, integrity, software applications, security, privacy, budgets and expenditures, cost control, and productivity. Guidelines are available to assist auditors in their jobs, such as those from Information Systems Audit and Control Association.

== History of IT auditing ==
The concept of IT auditing was formed in the mid-1960s. Since that time, IT auditing has gone through numerous changes, largely due to advances in technology and the incorporation of technology into business.

Currently, there are many IT-dependent companies that rely on information technology in order to operate their business e.g. telecommunication or banking company. For the other types of business, IT plays the big part of company including the applying of workflow instead of using the paper request form, using the application control instead of manual control which is more reliable or implementing the ERP application to facilitate the organization by using only one application. According to these, the importance of IT audit is constantly increased. One of the most important roles of the IT audit is to audit over the critical system in order to support the financial audit or to support the specific regulations announced e.g. SOX.

== Emerging issues ==
There are also new audits being imposed by various standard boards which are required to be performed, depending upon the audited organization, which will affect IT and ensure that IT departments are performing certain functions and controls appropriately to be considered compliant. Examples of such audits are SSAE 16, ISAE 3402, and ISO27001:2013.

=== Web presence audits ===
The extension of the corporate IT presence beyond the corporate firewall (e.g. the adoption of social media by the enterprise along with the proliferation of cloud-based tools like social media management systems) has elevated the importance of incorporating web presence audits into the IT/IS audit. The purposes of these audits include ensuring the company is taking the necessary steps to:

- rein in use of unauthorized tools (e.g. "shadow IT")
- minimize damage to reputation
- maintain regulatory compliance
- prevent information leakage
- mitigate third-party risk
- minimize governance risk

The use of departmental or user developed tools has been a controversial topic in the past. However, with the widespread availability of data analytics tools, dashboards, and statistical packages users no longer need to stand in line waiting for IT resources to fulfill seemingly endless requests for reports. The task of IT is to work with business groups to make authorized access and reporting as straightforward as possible. To use a simple example, users should not have to do their own data matching so that pure relational tables are linked in a meaningful way. IT needs to make non-normalized, data warehouse type files available to users so that their analysis work is simplified. For example, some organizations will refresh a warehouse periodically and create easy to use "flat' tables which can be easily uploaded by a package such as Tableau and used to create dashboards.

=== Enterprise communications audits ===
The rise of VOIP networks and issues like BYOD and the increasing capabilities of modern enterprise telephony systems causes increased risk of critical telephony infrastructure being misconfigured, leaving the enterprise open to the possibility of communications fraud or reduced system stability. Banks, financial institutions, and contact centers typically set up policies to be enforced across their communications systems. The task of auditing that the communications systems are in compliance with the policy falls on specialized telecom auditors. These audits ensure that the company's communication systems:

- adhere to stated policy
- follow policies designed to minimize the risk of hacking or phreaking
- maintain regulatory compliance
- prevent or minimize toll fraud
- mitigate third-party risk
- minimize governance risk

Enterprise communications audits are also called voice audits, but the term is increasingly deprecated as communications infrastructure increasingly becomes data-oriented and data-dependent. The term "telephony audit" is also deprecated because modern communications infrastructure, especially when dealing with customers, is omni-channel, where interaction takes place across multiple channels, not just over the telephone. One of the key issues that plagues enterprise communication audits is the lack of industry-defined or government-approved standards. IT audits are built on the basis of adherence to standards and policies published by organizations such as NIST and PCI, but the absence of such standards for enterprise communications audits means that these audits have to be based an organization's internal standards and policies, rather than industry standards. As a result, enterprise communications audits are still manually done, with random sampling checks. Policy Audit Automation tools for enterprise communications have only recently become available.

=== Ethical Dilemmas in IT Audits ===
The Use of Artificial Intelligence (AI) in IT audits is growing rapidly, with 30% of all corporate audits to be conducted using AI by 2025 as reported by the World Economic forum from 2015. AI in IT audits raises many ethical issues.

1. The use of Artificial Intelligence causes unintended biases in results
  An issue that AI faces in completing IT audits for corporations is that unintended biases can occur as the AI filters through data. AI does not have a human element or the ability to understand different situations in which certain data is expected or not expected. AI only understands the data in which it has seen before and therefore is unable to evolve given each unique situation. This causes unintended biases and therefore unintended consequences if the AI systems are given too much trust and not carefully monitored by the human eye. As a result ethical, legal and economic issues arise.
2. Technology replacing the role of humans
  Big 4 firms have invested significant amounts of money in emerging technologies in the IT audit space. AI is now being used in assurance practices performing tasks such as “auditing and accounting procedures such as review of general ledgers, tax compliance, preparing work-papers, data analytics, expense compliance, fraud detection, and decision-making.” This essentially replaces the need for auditors and relegates those who work in assurance to roles as “overseers” of the technology.
  However, firms still need auditors to perform analysis on the AI results of the IT audit. Auditors who do not understand the algorithms being utilized in the audit can allow mistakes to be made by these imperfect programs. Thus auditors with extensive tech backgrounds and degrees in technology are highly coveted by firms utilizing AI to perform audits.

== Effect of IT Audit on Companies and Financial Audits ==
Globalization in combination with the growth in information technology systems has caused companies to shift to an increasingly digitized working environment. Advantages provided by these systems include a reduction in working time, the ability to test large amounts of data, reduce audit risk, and provide more flexible and complete analytical information. With an increase in time, auditors are able to implement additional audit tests, leading to a great improvement in the audit process overall. The use of computer-assisted audit techniques (CAATs) have allowed companies to examine larger samples of data and more thorough reviews of all transactions, allowing the auditor to test and better understand any issues within the data.

The use of IT systems in audits has transformed the way auditors accomplish important audit functions such as the management of databases, risk assurance and controls, and even governance and compliance. In addition, IT audit systems improve the operational efficiency and aid in decision making that would otherwise be left to hand-held calculations. IT systems help to eliminate the human error in audits and while it does not fully solve the issue, IT systems have proven to be helpful in audits done by the Big 4 and small firms alike. These systems have greatly reduced the margin of error on audits and provide a better insight into the data being analyzed.

As a result of the increased use of IT systems in audits, authoritative bodies such as the American Institute of Certified Public Accountants (AICPA) and the Information Systems Audit Control Association (ISACA) have established guidance on how to properly use IT systems to perform audits. Auditors must now adhere to the established guidelines when utilizing IT systems in audits.

== Benefits of Utilizing IT systems on Financial Audits ==
The use of IT systems and AI techniques on financial audits is starting to show huge benefits for leading accounting firms. In a study done by one of the Big 4 accounting firms, it is expected that the use of IT Systems and AI techniques will generate an increase of $6.6 trillion in revenue as a result of the increase in productivity. As a result, leading auditing firms are making enormous investments with the goal of increasing productivity and therefore revenue through the development or outsourcing of IT systems and AI techniques to assist in financial audits.

PwC, one of the biggest auditing firms in the world, has narrowed down three different types of IT systems and AI techniques that firms can develop and implement to achieve increased revenue and productivity. The first system is by created in a way that technology systems that play a supplemental role in the human auditors decision-making. This allows the human auditor to retain autonomy over decisions and use the technology to support and enhance their ability to perform accurate work, ultimately saving the firm in productivity costs. Next, PwC states that systems with problem solving abilities are imperative to producing the most accurate results. PwC recognizes the increased margin for error due to unintended biases, and thus the need for creating systems that are able to adapt to different scenarios. This type of system requires decision making to be shared between the human auditor and the IT system to produce the maximum output by allowing the system to take over the computing work that could not be one by a human auditor alone. Finally, PwC recognizes that there are scenarios where technology needs to have the autonomy of decision making and act independently. This allows human auditors to focus on more important tasks while the technology takes care of time consuming tasks that do not require human time.

The utilization of IT systems and AI techniques on financial audits extend past the goal of reaching maximized productivity and increased revenue. Firms who utilize these systems to assist in the completion of audits are able to identify pieces of data that may constitute fraud with higher efficiency and accuracy. For example, systems such as drones have been approved by all four of the big 4 to assist in obtaining more accurate inventory calculations, meanwhile voice and facial recognition is adding firms in fraud cases.

== See also ==
- Electronic data processing

=== Computer forensics ===
- Computer forensics
- Data analysis

=== Operations ===
- Helpdesk and incident reporting auditing
- Change management auditing
- Disaster recovery and business continuity auditing
- ISAE 3402

=== Miscellaneous ===
- XBRL assurance

=== Irregularities and illegal acts ===
- AICPA Standard: SAS 99 Consideration of Fraud in a Financial Statement Audit
- Computer fraud case studies
