= Helpdesk and incident reporting auditing =

Help desk and incident reporting auditing is an examination of the controls within the help desk operations. The audit process collects and evaluates evidence of an organization's help desk and incident reporting practices, and operations. The audit ensures that all problems reported by users have been adequately documented and that controls exist so that only authorized staff can archive the users’ entries. It also determine if there are sufficient controls to escalate issues according to priority.

== Types of help desks ==
The management and support of IT assets can be essential for businesses. Help desks can be key aspects of business service and operation. Through the help desk, problems can be reported, managed and then resolved. Help desks can provide both internal and external users the ability to ask questions and receive effective answers. Help desks can help the organization run and improve the quality of the support it offers to the users.

- Traditional - Help desks have been traditionally used as call centers. Telephone support was the main medium used until the advent of Internet. Although telephone support has worked effectively and is still being used today, it has a number of weaknesses. For example, it is frustrating for customers to be put on hold or navigate automated phone answering messages.
- Internet - The advent of the Internet has provided the opportunity for potential and existing customers to communicate with suppliers directly and to review and buy their services online. Customers can email their problems without being put on hold over the phone. One of the largest advantages Internet help desks have over call centers are that it is available 24/7. This is extremely important in today's global business world where customers and staff members may be in different time zones.

== Help desk auditing ==
=== Objectives ===
- Determine if the sufficient controls have been implemented into the system. This will ensure that all problems reported by users have been adequately documented. The controls exist so that only authorized staff can archive the users’ entries. Also, customers should be notified of the timing of the corrective action.
- Determine if there are sufficient controls to escalate issues according to priority. In addition, it is necessary to determine whether the trial has been completely recorded and what action has been taken by whom.
- Monitor if customer requests are timely cleared. Outstanding requests should be reviewed and actions should be taken immediately.

=== Auditing procedure ===
- Review and evaluate the overall process followed by the help desk. The review should focus on how the incoming problems are handled, if the problems are classified and prioritized, and if there is timely follow up to ensure efficient and complete resolution.
- Observe the operation. This observation should include the promptness of answering questions, immediate logging, and adequate knowledge to resolve problems quickly.
- Perform a test to determine the control environment. For example, the auditor could test whether all the users’ requests are logged into the system and whether all questions are properly documented.
- Determine if management defines the help desk mission statement. Also, the auditor should evaluate whether management has established clear responsibilities for the help desk.
- Evaluate the help desk service level by determining the management's methods of performing services. This can be accomplished by asking these questions:
1. Does management calculate how many problems are reported per month?
2. How many problems are resolved per month by individual help desk staff members?
3. Does management compare the number of problems reported per day with the number of problems resolved per day?

For the last question, tracking systems will help to identify whether the help desk has adequate staff to deal with the number of issues received at any given time. Furthermore, the problems distribution should be monitored to ensure that the staff is appropriately scheduled in to meet customer demand.

- Evaluate the training of the help desk technicians. This will help determine if they are aware of the development of hardware and software, industry trends and have sufficient technical skills.
- Check the security systems of the help desk. This includes such systems as physical security and password access controls.

== Software ==
Today, there are many software choices which help management operate the help desk functions. In addition, these software products greatly improve the auditing of help desk operation. Help desk software is management software that automates many features of an organization's help desk environment, such as automated email response. It gives businesses the capability of using a systematic approach to responding to both internal and external users.

The typical functionality of help desk software includes: call management, call tracking, knowledge management, problem resolution, and self-help capabilities.

The core components of any help desk software application include the abilities to record and track support requests through all stages. In addition, reporting is also a key element to providing detailed information on how the system is running. The right choice of help desk software depends on the size of the organization and the complexity of the support process. The business needs will vary greatly during different periods of time.

=== Help desk software common functions ===
- Help desk software systems range in complexity from basic ticket logging to fully integrated CRM systems.
- Functionality is varied, but the essential core elements are the recording and tracking of support requests.
- Reporting is important and often complemented by a third party application for user-definable reports.
- Service Level management is often crucial to the help desk process as a measure of its success. This is usually an automated benefit of the help desk application.
- Knowledge management and self-service: Help desk software often includes a searchable knowledge base containing FAQs, troubleshooting guides and articles, allowing users to find solutions independently and reducing the number of support requests handled by agents.

== Outsourcing ==
Organizations may outsource their help desk functions. However, responsibility for those functions remains with the organization. Outsourcing offers both benefits and risks. Research and planning can help an organization determine whether outsourcing is appropriate and understand its ongoing responsibilities.

== Summary ==
Help desks may improve operational efficiency, reduce costs, increase customer satisfaction, and affect an organization's public image.

Effective auditing practices can contribute to maintaining the high quality of help desks, and help desk software may further improve the efficiency of help desk auditing.

== See also ==
- Comparison of help desk issue tracking software
- Information technology audit
- Information technology audit - operations
