= Software audit =

Software audit may refer to:

- Software licensing audit, where a user of software is audited for license compliance
- Software quality assurance, where a piece of software is audited for quality
- Software audit review, where a group of people external to a software development organisation examines a software product
- Physical configuration audit
- Functional configuration audit
