= Assurance services =

Profession giving information to reduce risk

Assurance service is an independent professional service, typically provided by Chartered or Certified Public Accountants or Chartered Certified Accountants, with the goal of improving information or the context of information so that decision makers can make more informed, and presumably better, decisions. Assurance services provide independent and professional opinions that reduce information risk (risk from incorrect information).

== Definition and distinction from other services ==
The technical definition of assurance requires five components set out in the International Framework for Assurance Engagements:

1. A three-party relationship – the responsible party who prepares the information to be assured; the independent practitioner who assures the information; and the users who are expected to rely on the information. In the case of an audit, the responsible party is the management of the company, the practitioner is the audit firm and the users are primarily the shareholders.
2. Agreed subject matter – in the case of an audit, this would be the annual accounts of a company. However it could be almost anything in practice – the systems operated by a state lottery, a company's greenhouse gas emissions, controls over a supply chain etc.
3. Suitable criteria – this means that there must be some agreed framework to which the information may be compared. In the case of an audit, this will be the form of company accounts mandated by the appropriate laws, regulations and accounting standards in a particular jurisdiction. For other subject matter, it might be the design and proper operation (as specified) of the lottery systems and controls.
4. Sufficient appropriate evidence. The practitioner must obtain sufficient appropriate evidence that the subject matter information (the data related to the subject matter) agrees with the criteria.
5. A conclusion expressed in a written report.

Audits are therefore a type of assurance service. However, audits only test the validity of the assertions in financial statements, and are subject to regulation under International Standards on Auditing. Assurance engagements designed to test historical financial information are referred to as assurance reviews (these are regulated by International Standard on Review Engagements (ISRE 2400)), but assurance reports can be obtained over many other subject matters and will then be subject to ISAE 3000 or other individual Standards on Assurance Engagements.

Consulting services are not considered as assurance because in consulting services, an accountant generally uses their professional knowledge to make recommendations for a future event or a procedure, such as the design of an information system or accounting control system. In contrast, assurance services are designed to test the validity of past data of the business cycles. Although there is no boundary to what can be tested by assurance services, professional accountants cannot accept any engagement for which they do not believe themselves to be competent.

Agreed–upon procedures do not constitute an assurance procedure under the above definition, because no conclusion is given. However, they are often loosely referred to as "assurance". Similarly compilation engagements (which also have no conclusion) are often described as giving assurance, but are not strictly assurance engagements.

== Guidance ==
Technical guidance for practitioners wishing to undertake assurance services can be found in ISAE (International Standard on Assurance Engagements) 3000 ISAE 3000 and in The Assurance Sourcebook published by ICAEW (Institute of Chartered Accountants in England and Wales) which also includes advice for companies wishing to choose between various assurance services.

== See also ==
- ISAE 3000
