= International Auditing and Assurance Standards Board =

Professional body for auditing standards

The International Auditing and Assurance Standards Board (IAASB) is an independent standards body that issues standards, like the International Standards on Auditing, International Standards on Quality Management, and other services, to support the international auditing of financial statements. It is a body supported by the International Foundation for Ethics and Audit. The Public Interest Oversight Board provides oversight of the IAASB, ensuring that the standards are in the public interest.

To further ensure proposed standards are in the public interest the IAASB consults its Consultative Advisory Group, which is composed of standard setters, various international organizations from the private and public sectors, and regulators. Representatives include a balance of users and preparers of financial statements, and should to the extent practicable be balanced geographically.

Founded in March 1978 as the International Auditing Practices Committee (IAPC), the IAASB's current strategic objectives include:

- Increase the emphasis on emerging issues to ensure that the IAASB International Standards provide a foundation for high-quality audit, assurance and related services engagements
- Innovate the IAASB’s ways of working to strengthen and broaden our agility, capabilities, and capacity to do the right work at the right time
- Maintain and deepen relationships with stakeholders to achieve globally relevant, progressive and operable standards

== See also ==
- International Organization of Supreme Audit Institutions
- International Public Sector Accounting Standards
