= Computer-aided audit tools =

Data analysis software

Computer-assisted audit tool (CAATs) or computer-assisted audit tools and techniques (CAATTs) is a growing field within the IT audit profession. CAATs is the practice of using computers to automate the IT audit processes. CAATs normally include using basic office productivity software such as spreadsheets, word processors and text editing programs and more advanced software packages involving use statistical analysis and business intelligence tools. But also more dedicated specialized software are available (see below).

CAATs have become synonymous with data analytics in the audit process.

== Traditional auditing vs CAATs ==
=== Traditional audit example ===
The traditional method of auditing allows auditors to build conclusions based upon a limited sample of a population, rather than an examination of all available or a large sample of data.

=== CAATTs alternative ===
CAATTs, not CAATs, addresses these problems. CAATTs, as it is commonly used, is the practice of analyzing large volumes of data looking for anomalies. A well-designed CAATTs audit will not be a sample, but rather a complete review of all transactions. Using CAATTs the auditor will extract every transaction the business unit performed during the period reviewed. The auditor will then test that data to determine if there are any problems in the data.

=== Traditional audit vs CAATTs on specific risks ===
Another advantage of CAATTs is that it allows auditors to test for specific risks. For example, an insurance company may want to ensure that it doesn't pay any claims after a policy is terminated. Using traditional audit techniques this risk would be very difficult to test. The auditor would "randomly select" a "statistically valid" sample of claims (usually if any of those claims were processed after a policy was terminated). Since the insurance company might process millions of claims the odds that any of those 30–50 "randomly selected" claims occurred after the policy was terminated is extremely unlikely.

Using CAATTs the auditor can select every claim that had a date of service after the policy termination date. The auditor then can determine if any claims were inappropriately paid. If they were, the auditor can then figure out why the controls to prevent this failure. In a real-life audit, the CAATTs auditor noted that several claims had been paid after policies were terminated. Using CAATTs the auditor was able to identify every claim that was paid and the exact dollar amount incorrectly paid by the insurance company. Furthermore, the auditor was able to identify the reason why these claims were paid. The reason why they were paid was because the participant paid their premium. The insurance company, having received a payment, paid the claims. Then after paying the claim the participant's check bounced. When the check bounced, the participant's policy was retrospectively terminated, but the claim was still paid costing the company hundreds of thousands of dollars per year.

Which looks better in an audit report:

"Audit reviewed 50 transactions and noted one transaction that was processed incorrectly"

or

"Audit used CAATTs and tested every transaction over the past year. We noted XXX exceptions wherein the company paid YYY dollars on terminated policies."

However, the CAATTs driven review is limited only to the data saved on files in accordance with a systematic pattern. Much data is never documented this way. In addition saved data often contains deficiencies, is poorly classified, is not easy to get, and it might be hard to become convinced about its integrity. So, for the present CAATTs is a complement to an auditor's tools and techniques. In certain audits, CAATTs can't be used at all. But there are also audits that simply can't be made with due care and efficiently without CAATTs.

== Specialized software ==
In the most general terms, CAATTs can refer to any computer program utilized to improve the audit process. Generally, however, it is used to refer to any data extraction and analysis software. This would include programs such as data analysis and extraction tools, spreadsheets (e.g. Excel), databases (e.g. Access), statistical analysis (e.g. SAS), generalized audit software (e.g. ACL, Arbutus, EAS), business intelligence (e.g. Crystal Reports and Business Objects), etc.

Benefits of audit software include:

- They are independent of the system being audited and will use a read-only copy of the file to avoid any corruption of an organization’s data.
- Many audit-specific routines are used such as sampling.
- Provides documentation of each test performed in the software that can be used as documentation in the auditor’s work papers.

Audit specialized software may perform the following functions:

- Data queries.
- Data stratification.
- Sample extractions.
- Missing sequence identification.
- Statistical analysis.
- Calculations.
- Duplicate transaction identification.
- Pivot table creation.
- Cross tabulation.

== CAATs Education and Professional Development ==
=== CAATs Courses ===
CAATs are a fundamental tool used by auditors. This tool facilitates them to make search from the irregularities from the given data. With the help of this tool, the auditors and accountants of any firm will be able to provide more analytical results. These tools are used throughout every business environment and in industry sectors too. With the help of computer-assisted audit techniques, more forensic accounting with more analysis can be done. Working with CAATs, it is essential for the accountant or the auditor to select the right data. After selecting the right data, import that to the CAATs, now the tool will automatically generate the analytical data. This tool contributes to the efficiency of the auditors. The fundamental course outline include:

- Computer Auditing Overview
- Legal and Ethical Issues for Computer Auditors
- Understanding CAATs
- Computer Auditing Project Planning
- Data Access Skill and Knowledge
- Data Verify Skill and Knowledge
- Data Analysis Skill and Knowledge
- Audit Finding Report Skill and Knowledge

=== CAATs Certification Program ===
There are several certification programs from various CAATs vendors and professional associations as the following:

1. International Certified CAATs Practitioner (ICCP): established by the International Computer Auditing Education Association (ICAEA).
2. ACL™ Certified Data Analyst (ACDA): established by ACL Services Ltd.
3. Certified IDEA Data Analyst (CIDA): established by CaseWare Analytics.
4. Jacksoft Certified CAATs Practitioner (JCCP): established by Jacksoft Commerce Automation Ltd.

== Other uses of CAATs ==
In addition to using data analysis software, the auditor uses CAATs throughout the audit for the following activities while performing data analysis:

=== Creation of electronic work papers ===
Keeping electronic work papers on a centralized audit file or database will allow the auditor to navigate through current and archived working papers with ease. The database will make it easier for auditors to coordinate current audits and ensure they consider findings from prior or related projects. Additionally, the auditor will be able to electronically standardize audit forms and formats, which can improve both the quality and consistency of the audit working papers.

=== Fraud detection ===
CAATs provide auditors with tools that can identify unexpected or unexplained patterns in data that may indicate fraud. Whether the CAATs is simple or complex, data analysis provides many benefits in the prevention and detection of fraud.

CAATs can assist the auditor in detecting fraud by performing and creating the following,

=== Analytical tests ===
Evaluations of financial information made by studying plausible relationships among both financial and non-financial data to assess whether account balances appear reasonable (AU 329). Examples include ratio, trend, and Benford's Law tests.

=== Data analysis reports ===
Reports produced using specific audit commands such as filtering records and joining data files.

=== Continuous monitoring ===
Continuous monitoring is an ongoing process for acquiring, analyzing, and reporting on business data to identify and respond to operational business risks. For auditors to ensure a comprehensive approach to acquire, analyze, and report on business data, they must make certain the organization continuously monitors user activity on all computer systems, business transactions and processes, and application controls.

=== Curb stoning in surveys ===
Curb stoning is the term for instances where a surveyor completes a survey form by making up data. Because some of the data should conform with Benford's law, this practice can be detected using CAATTs which provide the capability of performing such tests.

=== Note on the acronyms CAATTs vs CAATs ===
CAATTs and CAATs are used interchangeably. While CAATs has emerged as the more common spelling, CAATTs is the more precise acronym. The acronym CAATTs solves one of the two problems with defining the acronym. CAATs means:

Computer Aided (or Assisted) Audit Techniques (or Tools and Techniques)

The first "A" and the "T" can have two different meanings depending on who uses the term. By using the term CAATTs, one is clearly incorporating both "Tools" AND "Techniques."

== Comparison of tools ==
=== Comparison by specification ===
Product Name / Brand	Developed by	Latest stable version	Latest release date	OS	Software license	Open source	Comments
Arbutus Analyzer	Arbutus Software	7.00	2021-05-31	Windows	Proprietary commercial	No	
Audit Command Language (ACL)	Galvanize	15.0	2020-10-31	Windows	Proprietary commercial	No	Starting 2014 provide a free Excel add-in
Easy2Analyse	QDAC.net.	4.3	2015-05-15	Windows	Proprietary commercial	No	Available in full and auditfiles version
Intrasoft Audit Support Computer Audit (Formerly known as ESKORT / SESAM)	Intrasoft International	7.5	2021-03-31	Windows	Proprietary commercial	No	Requires Excel for showing graphs and result of Benford law analysis.
InfoZoom	humanIT	9.0.5	2016-11-07	Windows	Proprietary commercial	No	
Interactive Data Extraction and Analysis (IDEA)	CaseWare International Inc.	11.1	2016-10-26	Windows	Proprietary commercial	No	
TeamMate Analytics (formerly TopCAATs)	Wolters Kluwer	5.1	2017-09-18	Windows	Proprietary commercial	No	Requires Microsoft Excel (TeamMate Analytics runs within Excel)
SoftCAAT/ eCAAT	Wincer Infotech Limited	9.0/ 9.0	2016-04-04	Windows	Proprietary commercial	No	SoftCAAT is an independent application. eCAAT requires Microsoft Excel (eCAAT is an Excel add-in)

=== Comparison by analysis features ===
The following table compares features of specialized computer-aided audit tools. The table has several fields, as follows:

1. Product Name: Product's name; sometime includes edition if a certain edition is targeted.
2. Age analysis: Specifies whether the product supports making age analysis (stratification by date).
3. Benford's law: Specifies whether the product supports finding abnormal distribution of specific digits accordingly to Benford's law.
4. Calculated field: Specifies whether the product supports adding extra calculated fields into the table/file. Usually implies using an expression builder feature to build up expressions for defining the field calculation.
5. Drill-down (Table): Specifies whether the product supports drill-down features by zooming in (filtering) on selected rows in the table.
6. Drill-down (Pivot): Specifies whether the product supports drill-down features through pivot table.
7. Matching: Specifies whether the product supports finding matching items for a specific field in a table/file. For example, this could be used to find duplicate billings of invoices within the sales ledger.
8. Matching (Fuzzy): Specifies whether the product supports finding matching items for a specific field using fuzzy comparison. For instance, values compared are similar but not exactly the same (e.g., using Levenshtein matching).
9. Sample (Random): Specifies whether the product supports selecting a random sample of rows from the table/file (population).
10. Sample (Monetary unit): Specifies whether the product supports selecting a monetary unit sample of rows from the table/field (population). This is also known as dollar-unit sampling (when values are in U.S. currency).
11. Sequence check (Gap): Specifies whether the product supports can find (identify) gabs (in sequences) for a specific field. For example, finding a broken sequence in an invoice number sequence.
12. Sort field: Specifies whether the product supports sorting (indexing) by a specific field (column). Sorting helps identifying blank/empty values or excessive (out-of-band) values.
13. Sort multiple fields: Specifies whether the product supports sorting by multiple fields (columns).
14. Statistics: Specifies whether the product supports calculation and presentation of various statistics on a specific field (e.g., for the values of a numeric field such as a total number of positive numbers, total number negative numbers, average value (balance), etc.)
15. Stratification: Specifies whether the product supports stratification on number (amount) values in specified intervals. Splits the population into strata (intervals) and aggregates (summarizes) values. Can be used to find largest, smallest and average amount transactions (rows).
16. Total row: Specifies whether the products supports displaying a total row for the table/file, e.g. accumulated numerical value.

Product Name	Age Analysis	Benford's law	Calculated field	Drill-down (Table)	Drill-down (Pivot)	Matching	Matching (Fuzzy)	Sample (Random)	Sample (Monetary unit)	Sequence Check (Gap)	Sort field	Sort multiple fields	Statistics	Stratification	Total row
Analyzer - Arbutus Software	Yes	Yes	Yes	Yes	Yes	Yes	Yes	Yes	Yes	Yes	Yes	Yes	Yes	Yes	Yes
Audit Command Language (ACL)	Yes	Yes	Yes	Yes	Yes	Yes	Yes	Yes	Yes	Yes	Yes	Yes	Yes	Yes	Yes
Easy2Analyse (QDAC.net)	Yes	Yes	Yes	Yes	Yes	Yes	Yes	Yes	Yes	Yes	Yes	Yes	Yes	Yes	Yes
Intrasoft Audit Support Computer Audit	Yes	Yes	Yes	Yes	Yes	Yes	Yes	Yes	Yes	Yes	Yes	Yes	Yes	Yes	Yes
InfoZoom	Yes	Yes	Yes	Yes	Yes	Yes	Yes	Yes	Yes	Yes	Yes	Yes	Yes	Yes	Yes
Interactive Data Extraction and Analysis (IDEA)	Yes	Yes	Yes	Yes	Yes	Yes	Yes	Yes	Yes	Yes	Yes	Yes	Yes	Yes	Yes
TeamMate Analytics / TopCAATs	Yes	Yes	Yes	Yes	Yes	Yes	Yes	Yes	Yes	Yes	Yes	Yes	Yes	Yes	Yes
SoftCAAT/ eCAAT	Yes	Yes	Yes	Yes	No	Yes	Yes	Yes	No	Yes	Yes	Yes	Yes	Yes	Yes

=== Comparison by other features ===
1. Audit log: Specifies whether the product logs activity performed by the user (the auditor) for later reference (e.g., inclusion into audit report).
2. Data graph: Specifies whether the product provides graphs of results.
3. Export (CSV): Specifies whether the product support exporting selected rows to a comma-separated values formatted file. Usually also implies capability to the clipboard (in CSV format) for pasting into applications supporting pasting from CSV files such as Excel.
4. Export (DBF): Specifies whether the product support exporting (saving) selected rows to a dBase Table file.
5. Export (Excel): Specifies whether the product support exporting (saving) selected rows to an Excel file. Usually also implies capability to copy the rows to the clipboard (in some format) for pasting into Excel.

Product Name	Audit log	Data graph	Export (CSV)	Export (DBF)	Export (Excel)
Analyzer - Arbutus Software	Yes	Yes	Yes	Yes	Yes
Audit Command Language (ACL)	Yes	Yes	Yes	Yes	Yes
Easy2Analyse (QDAC.net)	Yes	Yes	Yes	Yes	Yes
Intasoft Audit Support Computer Audit	Yes	Yes	Yes	Yes	Yes
InfoZoom	Yes	Yes	Yes	No	Yes
Interactive Data Extraction and Analysis (IDEA)	Yes	Yes	Yes	Yes	Yes
TeamMate Analytics / TopCAATs	Yes	Yes	Yes	No	Yes
SoftCAAT/ eCAAT	Yes	Yes	Yes	No	Yes

=== Comparison by data preparation features ===
1. Append/Merge: Specifies whether the product can combine two tables/files with identical fields into a single table/file. For example, it could be doing a merge of two years of accounts payable tables/files into a single table/file.
2. Import wizard: Specifies whether the product provides an import wizard to assist in importing (interpretation, conversion, formatting) data for analysis.
3. Import (CSV): Specifies whether the product supports import data from a comma-separated values formatted file.
4. Import (DBF): Specifies whether the product supports import data from dBase DBF files.
5. Import (Excel): Specifies whether the product supports import data from Microsoft Excel workbook file. Note that different Excel format versions may apply.
6. Import (SAF-T): Specifies whether the product supports import data from an OECD SAF-T file. As SAF-T is based on XML a more general XML import may cover the feature although direct SAF-T import improves the user experience. Note that different SAF-T format versions may apply.
7. Import (SIE): Specifies whether the product supports import data from a SIE format file.
8. Import (XBRL-GL): Specifies whether the product supports import data from a XBRL GL file. As XBRL-GL is based on XML a more general XML import may cover the feature although direct XBRL-GL import improves the user experience. Note that different XBRL-GL format versions may apply.

Product Name	Append/Merge	Import wizard	Import (CSV)	Import (DBF)	Import (Excel)	Import (SAF-T)	Import (SIE)	Import (XBRL-GL)
Analyzer - Arbutus Software	Yes	Yes	Yes	Yes	Yes	Yes	Yes	Yes
Audit Command Language (ACL)	Yes	Yes	Yes	Yes	Yes	?	?	Yes
Easy2Analyse (QDAC.net)	Yes	Yes	Yes	Yes	Yes	Yes	Yes	Yes
Intrasoft Audit Support Computer Audit (SESAM)	Yes	Yes	Yes	Yes	Yes	Yes	Yes	Yes
InfoZoom	Yes	Yes	Yes	Yes	Yes	?	?	?
Interactive Data Extraction and Analysis (IDEA)	Yes	Yes	Yes	Yes	Yes	Yes	Yes	Yes
TeamMate Analytics / TopCAATs	Yes	Yes	Yes	Yes	Yes	Yes	?	Yes
SoftCAAT/ eCAAT	Yes	Yes	Yes	Yes	Yes	No	No	No

== See also ==
- Generalized audit software
- Information technology audit
- Separation of duties
