= Chart of accounts =

Accounting term

A chart of accounts (COA) is a list of financial accounts and reference numbers, grouped into categories, such as assets, liabilities, equity, revenue and expenses, and used for recording transactions in the organization's general ledger. Accounts may be associated with an identifier (account number) and a caption or header and are coded by account type. In computerized accounting systems with computable quantity accounting, the accounts can have a quantity measure definition. Account numbers may consist of numerical, alphabetic, or alpha-numeric characters, although in many computerized environments, like the SIE format, only numerical identifiers are allowed. The structure and headings of accounts should assist in consistent posting of transactions. Each nominal ledger account is unique, which allows its ledger to be located. The accounts are typically arranged in the order of the customary appearance of accounts in the financial statements: balance sheet accounts followed by profit and loss accounts.

The charts of accounts can be picked from a standard chart of accounts, like the BAS in Sweden. In some countries, charts of accounts are defined by the accountant from a standard general layouts or as regulated by law. However, in most countries it is entirely up to each accountant to design the chart of accounts.

== Administration ==
A chart of accounts is usually created for an organization by an accountant and available for use by the bookkeeper.

Each account in the chart of accounts is typically assigned a name. Accounts may also be assigned a unique account number by which the account can be identified. Account numbers may be structured to suit the needs of an organization, such as digit/s representing a division of the company, a department, the type of account, etc. The first digit might, for example, signify the type of account (asset, liability, etc.). In accounting software, using the account number may be a more rapid way to post to an account, and allows accounts to be presented in numeric order rather than alphabetic order.

Accounts are used in the generation of a trial balance, a list of the active general ledger accounts with their respective debit and credit balances used to test the completeness of a set of accounts: if the debit and credit totals match, the indication is that the accounts are being correctly maintained. However, a balanced trial balance does not guarantee that there are no errors in the individual ledger entries.

Accounts may be added to the chart of accounts as needed; they would not generally be removed, especially if any transaction had been posted to the account or if there is a non-zero balance.

== International aspects and accounting information interchange – Charts of accounts and tax harmonisation issues ==
While some countries define standard national charts of accounts (for example France and Germany) others such as the United States and United Kingdom do not. In the European Union, most countries codify a national GAAP (consistent with the EU accounting directives) and also require IFRS (as outlined by the IAS regulation) for public companies. The former often define a chart of accounts while the latter does not. The European Commission has spent a great deal of effort on administrative tax harmonisation, and this harmonization is the main focus of the latest version of the EU VAT directive, which aims to achieve better harmonization and support electronic trade documents, such as electronic invoices used in cross border trade, especially within the European Union Value Added Tax Area. However, since national GAAPs often serve as the basis for determining income tax, and since income tax law is reserved for the member states, no single uniform EU chart of accounts exists.

== Types of accounts ==
There are various types of accounts:

1. Asset accounts are used to identify assets. An asset is a present right of an entity to an economic benefit (CF E16). Common examples of asset accounts include cash on hand, cash in bank, receivables, inventory, pre-paid expenses, land, structures, equipment, patents, copyrights, licenses, etc. Goodwill is different from other assets in that it is not used in operations and cannot be sold, licensed or otherwise transferred.
2. Liability accounts are used to recognize liabilities. A liability is a present obligation of an entity to transfer an economic benefit (CF E37). Common examples of liability accounts include accounts payable, deferred revenue, bank loans, bonds payable and lease obligations.
3. Equity accounts are used to recognize ownership equity. The terms equity [for profit enterprise] or net assets [not-for-profit enterprise] represent the residual interest in the assets of an entity that remains after deducting its liabilities (CF E61). Equity accounts include common stock, paid-in capital, and retained earnings. Equity accounts can vary depending where an entity is domiciled as some jurisdictions require entities to keep various sub-classifications of equity in separate accounts.
4. Revenue accounts are used to recognize revenue. Revenues are inflows or other enhancements of assets of an entity or settlements of its liabilities (or a combination of both) from delivering or producing goods, rendering services, or carrying out other activities (CF E80).
5. Expense accounts are used to recognize expenses. Expenses are outflows or other using up of assets of an entity or incurrences of its liabilities (or a combination of both) from delivering or producing goods, rendering services, or carrying out other activities (CF E81).
6. Gain accounts are used to recognize gains. Gains are increases in equity (net assets) from transactions and other events and circumstances affecting an entity except those that result from revenues or investments by owners (CF E82). In practice, changes in the market value of assets (positive) or liabilities (negative) are recognized as gains while, for example, interest, dividends, rent or royalties received are recognized as other revenue.
7. Loss accounts are used to recognize losses. Losses are decreases in equity (net assets) from transactions and other events and circumstances affecting an entity except those that result from expenses or distributions to owners (CF E83). In practice, changes in the market value of assets (negative) or liabilities (positive) are recognized as losses while, for example, interest or charitable contributions are recognized as other expenses.
8. Income is the term generally used when referring to revenue and gains together. A separate term for the aggregation of expenses and losses does not exist.
9. Contra-accounts are accounts with negative balances that offset other balance sheet accounts. Examples are accumulated depreciation (offset against fixed assets), and the allowance for bad debts (offset against accounts receivable). Deferred interest is also offset against receivables rather than being classified as a liability. Contra accounts are also often referred to as adjustments or adjusting accounts.

== Example Chart of Accounts ==
=== Sample Chart of Accounts ===
A chart of accounts compatible with IFRS and US GAAP includes balance sheet (assets, liabilities and equity) and the profit and loss (revenue, expenses, gains and losses) classifications. If used by a consolidated or combined entity, it also includes separate classifications for intercompany transactions and balances.

Account Number—Account Title—Balance: Debit (Dr) / Credit (Cr)

1.0.0 Assets (Dr)

- 1.1.0 Cash And Financial Assets (Dr)
  - 1.1.1 Cash and Cash Equivalents (Dr)
  - 1.1.2 Financial Assets (Investments) (Dr)
  - 1.1.3 Restricted Cash and Financial Assets (Dr)
  - 1.1.4 Additional Financial Assets and Investments (Dr)
- 1.2.0 Receivables And Contracts (Dr)
  - 1.2.1 Accounts, Notes And Loans Receivable (Dr)
  - 1.2.2 Contracts (Dr)
  - 1.2.3 Nontrade And Other Receivables (Dr)
- 1.3.0 Inventory (Dr)
  - 1.3.1 Merchandise (Dr)
  - 1.3.2 Raw Material, Parts And Supplies (Dr)
  - 1.3.3 Work In Process (Dr)
  - 1.3.4 Finished Goods (Dr)
  - 1.3.5 Other Inventory (Dr)
- 1.4.0 Accruals And Additional Assets (Dr)
  - 1.4.1 Prepaid Expense (Dr)
  - 1.4.2 Accrued Income (Dr)
  - 1.4.3 Additional Assets (Dr)
- 1.5.0 Property, Plant And Equipment (Dr)
  - 1.5.1 Land And Land Improvements (Dr)
  - 1.5.2 Buildings, Structures And Improvements (Dr)
  - 1.5.3 Machinery And Equipment (Dr)
  - 1.5.4 Furniture And Fixtures (Dr)
  - 1.5.5 Right Of Use Assets (Classified As PP&E) (Dr)
  - 1.5.6 Other Property, Plant And Equipment (Dr)
  - 1.5.7 Construction In Progress (Dr)
- 1.6.0 Property, Plant And Equipment Accumulated Depreciation And Depletion (Cr)
  - 1.6.1 Accumulated Depletion (Cr)
  - 1.6.2 Accumulated Depreciation (Cr)
- 1.7.0 Intangible Assets (Excluding Goodwill) (Dr)
  - 1.7.1 Intellectual Property (Dr)
  - 1.7.2 Computer Software (Dr)
  - 1.7.3 Trade And Distribution Assets (Dr)
  - 1.7.4 Contracts And Rights (Dr)
  - 1.7.5 Right Of Use Assets (Dr)
  - 1.7.6 Crypto Assets (Dr)
  - 1.7.7 Other Intangible Assets (Dr)
  - 1.7.8 Acquisition In Progress (Dr)
- 1.8.0 Intangible Assets Accumulated Amortization (Cr)
- 1.9.0 Goodwill (Dr)

2.0.0 Liabilities (Cr)

- 2.1.0 Payables (Cr)
  - 2.1.1 Trade Payables (Cr)
  - 2.1.2 Dividends Payable (Cr)
  - 2.1.3 Interest Payable (Cr)
  - 2.1.4 Other Payables (Cr)
- 2.2.0 Accruals And Other Liabilities (Cr)
  - 2.2.1 Accrued Expenses (Including Payroll) (Cr)
  - 2.2.2 Deferred Income (Unearned Revenue) (Cr)
  - 2.2.3 Accrued Taxes (Other Than Payroll) (Cr)
  - 2.2.4 Other (Non-Financial) Liabilities (Cr)
- 2.3.0 Financial Liabilities (Cr)
  - 2.3.1 Notes Payable (Cr)
  - 2.3.2 Loans Payable (Cr)
  - 2.3.3 Bonds (Debentures) (Cr)
  - 2.3.4 Other Debts And Borrowings (Cr)
  - 2.3.5 Lease Obligations (Cr)
  - 2.3.6 Derivative Financial Liabilities (Cr)
  - 2.3.7 Other Financial Liabilities (Cr)
- 2.4.0 Provisions (Contingencies) (Cr)
  - 2.4.1 Customer Related Provisions (Cr)
  - 2.4.2 Ligation And Regulatory Provisions (Cr)
  - 2.4.3 Other Provisions (Cr)

3.0.0 Equity (Cr)

- 3.1.0 Owners Equity (Attributable To Owners Of Parent) (Cr)
  - 3.1.1 Equity At par (Issued Capital) (Cr)
  - 3.1.2 Additional Paid-in Capital (Cr)
- 3.2.0 Retained Earnings (Dr / Cr)
  - 3.2.1 Appropriated (Cr)
  - 3.2.2 Unappropriated (Cr)
  - 3.2.3 Deficit (Dr)
  - 3.2.4 In Suspense Zero
- 3.3.0 Accumulated OCI (Dr / Cr)
  - 3.3.1 Exchange Differences On Translation (Dr / Cr)
  - 3.3.2 Cash Flow Hedges (Dr / Cr)
  - 3.3.3 Gains And Losses On Remeasuring Available-For-Sale Investments (Dr / Cr)
  - 3.3.4 Remeasurements Of Defined Benefit Plans (Dr / Cr)
  - 3.3.5 Revaluation Surplus (IFRS only) (Cr)
- 3.4.0 Other Equity Items (Dr / Cr)
  - 3.4.1 ESOP Related Items (Dr / Cr)
  - 3.4.2 Subscribed Stock Receivables (Dr)
  - 3.4.3 Treasury Stock (Not Extinguished) (Dr)
  - 3.4.4 Miscellaneous Equity (Cr)
- 3.5.0 Noncontrolling (Minority) Interest (Cr)

4.0.0 Revenue (Cr)

- 4.1.0 Recognized Point Of Time (Cr)
  - 4.1.1 Goods (Cr)
  - 4.1.2 Services (Cr)
- 4.2.0 Recognized Over Time (Cr)
  - 4.2.1 Products (Cr)
  - 4.2.2 Services (Cr)
- 4.3.0 Adjustments (Dr)
  - 4.3.1 Variable Consideration (Dr)
  - 4.3.2 Consideration Paid (Payable) To Customers (Dr)
  - 4.3.3 Other Adjustments (Dr)

5.0.0 Expenses (Dr)

- 5.1.0 Expenses Classified By Nature (Dr)
  - 5.1.1 Merchandise, Material, Parts And Supplies (Dr)
  - 5.1.2 Employee Benefits (Dr)
  - 5.1.3 Services (Dr)
  - 5.1.4 Rent, Depreciation, Amortization And Depletion (Dr)
  - 5.1.5 Increase (Decrease) In Inventories Of Finished Goods And Work In Progress (Dr / Cr)
  - 5.1.6 Other Work Performed By Entity And Capitalized (Cr)
- 5.2.0 Expenses Classified By Function (Dr)
  - 5.2.1 Cost Of Sales (Dr)
  - 5.2.2 Selling, General And Administrative (Dr)
  - 5.2.3 Credit Loss (Reversal) On Receivables (Dr / Cr)

6.0.0 Other (Non-Operating) Income And Expenses (Dr / Cr)

- 6.1.0 Other Revenue And Expenses (Dr / Cr)
  - 6.1.1 Other Revenue (Cr)
  - 6.1.2 Other Expenses (Dr)
- 6.2.0 Gains And Losses (Dr / Cr)
  - 6.2.1 Foreign Currency Transaction Gain (Loss) (Dr / Cr)
  - 6.2.2 Gain (Loss) On Investments (Dr / Cr)
  - 6.2.3 Gain (Loss) On Derivatives (Dr / Cr)
  - 6.2.4 Crypto Asset Gain (Loss) (Dr / Cr)
  - 6.2.5 Gain (Loss) On Disposal Of Assets (Dr / Cr)
  - 6.2.6 Debt Related Gain (Loss) (Dr / Cr)
  - 6.2.7 Impairment Loss (Dr)
  - 6.2.8 Other Gains And Losses (Dr / Cr)
- 6.3.0 Taxes (Other Than Income And Payroll) And Fees (Dr)
  - 6.3.1 Real Estate Taxes And Insurance (Dr)
  - 6.3.2 Highway (Road) Taxes And Tolls (Dr)
  - 6.3.3 Direct Tax And License Fees (Dr)
  - 6.3.4 Excise And Sales Taxes (Dr)
  - 6.3.5 Customs Fees And Duties (Not Classified As Sales Or Excise) (Dr)
  - 6.3.6 Non-Deductible VAT (GST) (Dr)
  - 6.3.7 General Insurance Expense (Dr)
  - 6.3.8 Administrative Fees (Revenue Stamps) (Dr)
  - 6.3.9 Fines And Penalties (Dr)
  - 6.3.10 Miscellaneous Taxes (Dr)
  - 6.3.11 Other Taxes And Fees (Dr)
- 6.4.0 Income Tax Expense (Benefit) (Dr / Cr)

7.0.0 Intercompany And Related Party Accounts (Dr / Cr)

- 7.1.0 Intercompany And Related Party Assets (Dr)
  - 7.1.1 Intercompany Balances (Eliminated In Consolidation) (Dr)
  - 7.1.2 Related Party Balances (Reported Or Disclosed) (Dr)
  - 7.1.3 Intercompany Investments (Dr)
- 7.2.0 Intercompany And Related Party Liabilities (Cr)
  - 7.2.1 Intercompany Balances (Eliminated In Consolidation) (Cr)
  - 7.2.2 Related Party Balances (Reported Or Disclosed) (Cr)
- 7.3.0 Intercompany And Related Party Income And Expense (Dr / Cr)
  - 7.3.1 Intercompany And Related Party Income (Cr)
  - 7.3.2 Intercompany And Related Party Expenses (Dr)
  - 7.3.3 Income (Loss) From Equity Method Investments (Dr)

=== French GAAP Chart of Accounts Layout ===
The French generally accepted accounting principles chart of accounts layout is used in France, Belgium, Spain and many francophone countries. The use of the French GAAP chart of accounts layout (but not the detailed accounts) is stated in French law.

In France, liabilities and equity are seen as negative assets and not account types in themselves, just balance accounts.

==== Profit and Loss Accounts ====
- Class 6 Costs Accounts
- Class 7 Revenues Accounts

==== Special Accounts ====
- Class 8 Special Accounts

=== Spanish GAAP Chart of Accounts Layout ===
The Spanish generally accepted accounting principles chart of accounts layout is used in Spain. It is very similar to the French layout.

- Class 3 Stocks Accounts
- Class 4 Third-Party Accounts
- Class 5 Bank & Cash

==== Profit and Loss Accounts ====
- Class 6 Costs Accounts
- Class 7 Revenues Accounts

==== Special Accounts ====
- Class 8 Expenses Recognised In Equity
- Class 9 Income Recognised In Equity

=== Swedish BAS chart of accounts layout ===
The complete Swedish BAS standard chart of about 1250 accounts is also available in English and German texts in a printed publication from the non-profit branch BAS organisation. BAS is a private organisation originally created by the Swedish industry and today owned by a set general interest groups like, several industry organisations, several government authorities (incl GAAP and the revenue service), the Church of Sweden, the audits and accountants organisation and SIE (file format) organisation, as close as consensus possibly (a Swedish way of working without legal demands).

The BAS chart use is not legally required in Sweden. However, it is politically anchored and so well developed that it is commonly used.

The BAS chart is not an SIS national standard because SIS is organised on pay documentation and nobody in the computer world are paying for standard documents. BAS were SIS standard but left. SIS Swedish Standards Institute is the Swedish domestic member of ISO. This is not a government procurement problem due to the fact all significant governmental authorities are significant members/part owners of BAS.

An almost identical chart of accounts is used in Norway.

==== Balance Sheet Accounts ====
===== Asset accounts =====
- 1150 Buildings and land assets
- 1200 Inventories, Machines
- 1210 Alterna
- 1220 IngDirect Savings
- 1230 Tangerine chequing
- 1240 Account Receivable

===== Liability accounts =====
- 2300 Loans
- 2400 Short debts (payables 2440)
- 2500 Income Tax Payable
- 2600 VAT Payable
- 2700 Wages Payable
- 2800-2999 other liabilities

==== Profit & Loss accounts ====
===== Revenue accounts =====
- 3000 Revenue Accounts

===== Expense accounts =====
- 4000 Costs directly related to revenues
- 5000-7999 General expense Accounts
- 8000 Financial Accounts
- 9000 Contra-accounts

== See also ==
- General ledger
- Financial statement
- BAS Swedish standard chart of accounts, Version in English
- French generally accepted accounting principles
- Metadata, or "data about data." The Chart of accounts is in itself Metadata. It's a classification scheme that enables (intelligent) aggregation of individual financial transactions into coherent, and hopefully informative, financial statements.
- XBRL eXtensible Business Reporting Language, and the related, required encoding (or "tagging") of public company financial statement data in the U.S. by the Securities and Exchange Commission. In those instances The Chart of accounts must support the required encodings.
- Regulation S-X, Regulation S-K and Proxy statement In the U.S. the Securities and Exchange Commission prescribes and requires numerous quarterly and annual financial statement disclosures. A large portion of the required disclosures are numeric and must be supported by the Chart of accounts.
