= Saft =

"Saft" is a word for juice or diluting juice in Germanic languages.

Saft may refer to:

- Jamie Saft, American jazz musician
- Saft (band), band led by the Norwegian guitarist Trygve Thue
- Saft Groupe S.A., French battery company
- "Saft (song)", song by Die Fantastischen Vier
- SAF-T, Standard Audit File for Tax
- Statistical associating fluid theory (SAFT)
