= XBRL International =

International standards organization

XBRL International, Inc.
- Type: Consortium
- Founded: 1998
- Founder: American Institute of Certified Public Accountants (AICPA)
- Headquarters: US
- Key people: John Turner, CEO; Cees De Boer, Chair
- Website: www.xbrl.org

XBRL International (XII) is the international standards organization which develops and maintains the XBRL standard and related specifications in order to improve business reporting for the public good. It is a global not-for-profit consortium of approximately 600 public and private organisations working together to support the collection, sharing and use of structured data for data reporting and analysis.

== History ==
XBRL was originally the work of the AICPA, created as a way to advance financial reporting and facilitate the global exchange of financial data. XBRL International was created to ensure compatibility and agreement among industry members and to promote adoption of the standard around the world.

== Membership ==
XII members consist of Jurisdictions, the largest being XBRL US, which act as a country's representatives to the consortium, and Direct Members. Both member types include businesses, nonprofit organizations, universities, governmental entities, and in some cases individuals.

As of 2015, there are 24 Jurisdictions and one affiliated organization (XBRL Europe).

== Governance ==
XII is led by a Board of Directors elected by the membership. The Board sets the overall direction of the organisation and is composed of representatives from Jurisdictions, Direct Members and At-Large members who may be from outside the organisation.

Technical management of the XBRL Standard and the development of specifications is overseen by the XBRL Standards Board. The Best Practices Board is responsible for collecting, evaluating and disseminating guidance in XBRL implementation.
