= UN/CEFACT's Modeling Methodology =

UN/CEFACT's Modeling Methodology, commonly known as UMM is a modeling methodology which is developed by UN/CEFACT - United Nations Center for Trade Facilitation and Electronic Business.

== Goal of UMM ==
The primary goal of UMM is to capture business requirements of inter-organizational business processes. These requirements result in a platform independent UMM model. The UMM model can then be used to derive deployment artifacts for the IT systems of the participating business partners.

== UMM at a glance ==
UMM enables to capture business knowledge independent of the underlying implementation technology, like Web Services or ebXML. The goal is to specify a global choreography of a business collaboration serving as an “agreement” between the participating partners in the respective collaboration. Each business partner derives in turn its local orchestration, enabling the configuration of the business partner’s system for the use within a service-oriented architecture (SOA).

In order to guarantee user acceptance of the UMM, it must be both effective and easy to understand for the business process modelers and software architects.

UMM is based on the Unified Modeling Language (UML) and its current version is 1.0 with version 2.0 currently being under development.

UMM 1.0 is based on UML 1.4 whereas UMM 2.0 will be based on UML 2.1.

== Known Implementations ==
- Visualizing Inter ENterprise Network Architectures, an Add-In for Enterprise Architect supporting B2B collaborations with UMM and UPCC
- A UMM runtime framework including integration tools and registry
