= BAS (accounting) =

Method of charting data

The Swedish BAS chart of accounts (Basic chart), represents the Swedish accounting generally accepted accounting principles (GAAP) and is an open to use chart of accounts for accounting in Sweden available in Swedish, English and German language texts. Very similar chart of accounts are commonly used in neighbouring countries and applicable internationally.

It was developed by the Swedish industry in the 1960s and is today owned by its own foundation. The BAS chart was reformed in the late 1990s to adapt the IFRS chart layout directives and is known then as BAS2000, but today in general as just the BAS chart.

A nested group of organisations with BAS in the center is forming a common Swedish GAAP and common routines in accounting and domestic reporting standards.

== Commonly used in Sweden ==
There are no Swedish legal restrictions in charts of accounts, however most parts of the society are commonly and voluntarily using the BAS services and charts.

The SIE (file format) developed with BAS in mind, is used to transport data between different accounting software in the Swedish market. It is commonly used as interfaces between accounting and audits as well for importing data from pre-systems like systems for salaries and payable. SIEs definitions do not allow anything but number digits for account numbers, not even dots (can't transfer IFRS charts). However SIE is one of the most successful standard formats for accounting data interchange. It supports a competition market of multiple compatible vendors of accounting software with interchange of data. It allowed the creation of specialized commercial standard software for functions like income tax declarations and audit importing data from accounting.

The Swedish Companies Registration Office and XBRL Sweden is however not using the BAS chart and the SIE format in the general annual business report routines they worked out together, they use an XBRL taxonomy.

== Versions ==
The chart is the general guideline and every user can make any amendments and personally created accounts.

The governments authorities accounting led by the Swedish National Financial Management Authority and the communes led by Swedish Association of Local Authorities and Regions have special versions with adding special accounts for their purpose. Some of these accounts have more than four digit numbers (the SIE specifications allow larger strings of numbers).

== The BAS foundation ==
The BAS foundation is a non-profit (BAS-Interessenternas förening) organisation with 1 employee. The development of the BAS chart is made by committee work with its main members.

- The Confederation of Swedish Enterprise
- The Church of Sweden
- The Federation of Swedish Farmers
- The Swedish Tax Agency
- The Bokföringsnämnden (the GAAP authority)
- The FAR (audits vendor society)
- The SRF (accountants vendor society)
- The SIE (file format) (accounting SW vendor society)

The Bokföringsnämnden, BFN, is the Swedish Government agency with the task of promote the development of GAAP for use in private and public accounting. It makes advice on how to use the BAS chart in accounting in published directives. The BFN directives are made by its main expert committee board (mainly from the main members of the BAS foundation, appointed by the government).

The Bas Accounting Manual, How the accounts in the BAS chart of accounts are to be used is published annually by the BAS foundation.

== The BAS chart ==
The BAS chart is structured as each account has four digits. The first number indicates the account class. The following digits are used for more accurate breakdown, where the second digit indicates the account group, the third digit the main account and the fourth digit the sub-account.

- 1xxx Assets divided as 10xx Intangible fixed assets, 11xx-12xx Tangible fixed assets, 13xx Financial fixed assets (long-term receivables) 14xx Inventories, etc., 15xx-17xx Current receivables, 18xx Short-term investments, 19xx Cash and bank
- 20xx Equity, 21xx Untaxed reserves, 22xx Provisions, 23xx Long-term liabilities, 24xx-29xx Current liabilities
- 3xxx Revenue divided as 30xx-37xx Net sales, 38xx-39xx Other revenue
- 4xxx Costs for goods, materials and some purchased services
- 5xxx-6xxx Other external operating expenses
- 70xx-76xx Personnel costs, 77xx Write-downs, 78xx Depreciation, 79xx Other operating expenses
- 8xxx Financial items (e.g. interest / currency income / expenses), appropriations, tax and profit for the year
- 0xxx and 9xxx Internal accounts

== Subsets ==
The chart is published in three levels that are compatible (subsets):

- BAS chart basically for incorporated companies (K2/K3-tax reports), including a recommended subset
- BAS K1 chart basically for private non-incorporated partnerships (K1-tax reports), reduced subset
- BAS K1-mini basically for private non-incorporated firms (NE-tax reports), mini subset
