= UNeDocs =

Planned document standard for global electronic trade within UN/CEFACT

UNeDocs, or United Nations electronic Trade Documents, was a planned document standard for global electronic trade within UN/CEFACT. The project was suspended and placed under review in 2009 by the UN/CEFACT Bureau.

UNeDocs' goal was to provide a single adaptable electronic document for trade transactions. Due to the standardizations, users could automate various documentation tasks.

Later on, a UNeDocs 2.0 was passed, and now plays a responsibility in the (CBRDM) Cross Border Reference Data Model. In the complicated process, UNeDocs is part of National Data Harmonization and Cross Border Data Exchange
