= InfoZoom =

Data analysis, business intelligence and data visualization software product

- Developer: humanIT Software GmbH
- Stable release: February 11, 2021; 5 years ago
- Operating system: Windows
- Platform: .NET
- Available in: 9 languages
- List of languages English, German, Dutch, Portuguese, French, Italian, Polish, Spanish, Hungarian
- Type: Business intelligence
- License: Trialware
- Website: www.infozoom.com/en/

InfoZoom software is a data analysis, business intelligence and data visualization software product created using in-memory analytics. The software is created and supported by humanIT and the Fraunhofer Institute FIT, the same organization that created MP3 compression technology. The software has over 100,000 licensed users and over 1000 customers worldwide.

== History ==
InfoZoom software is developed by humanIT GmbH near Bonn, Germany. It was created in 1997 as a spin-off from the Fraunhofer Society which is the same scientific organization that contributed to MP3 compression technology. Since 2003, humanIT is a wholly owned subsidiary of proALPHA, an ERP (Enterprise resource planning) vendor based in Weilerbach, Germany. Today, InfoZoom is co-developed and supported by the Fraunhofer-Institut für Angewandte Informationstechnik (FIT), as known as the Fraunhofer Institute for Applied Information Technology in St. Augustin, Germany.

InfoZoom v6.0 was released in March, 2009. The 64-bit version of InfoZoom was released as v6.4 in November 2009. InfoZoom v7.0 was released in November, 2010, with the release of v8.0 in November 2011.

By the end of 2009, InfoZoom had grown significantly reaching 36,000 licensed users and 800 client organizations worldwide and in 2011 reaching 50,000 users with 1000 clients.

== Technology ==
InfoZoom works with in-memory technology and was programmed in the programming languages C++ and C# / .NET.

== Products ==
InfoZoom allows users to extract large amounts of information from multiple data sources, including any ODBC-compliant databases, Microsoft Excel, text files and other data sources. The software allows for data visualization of entire datasets through an easy-to-use graphical interface. The tool has applications in ad hoc data analysis and identification of data quality issues and has been used by major government organizations, including universities, as well as by corporations.

InfoZoom is also integrated into other software products and used as the reporting and analytical module. It is also implemented for analysis on the internet or intranet.

InfoZoom Software is available in four main product lines:

- InfoZoom Professional
- InfoZoom Business
- InfoZoom Explorer
- InfoZoom Viewer (available for free)

== Data sources ==
The following data sources can be loaded:

- relational database systems (RDBMS) such as Progress, Oracle, Microsoft SQL Server, Microsoft Access or MySQL
- Excel files (*.xls or *.xlsx)
- Text files or CSV files
- XML and JSON files
- all data sources that can be addressed via ODBC or OLE DB.

== Output options ==
The results are visualized using an integrated component for displaying tables and graphics. Optionally, the results can be output directly in Microsoft Office. Results can be actively linked so that the data displayed can be changed later.

There is a free add-in for Microsoft Excel. The analyzed data can be inserted directly into Excel via the add-in.

In addition to its own proprietary format, InfoZoom can export the data to HTML, Excel, Text files, Open Document Text, Word, and CSV files.

Other applications can use InfoZoom as a dynamic data source via the .NET data provider, e.g. B. Crystal Reports 2008.

== Areas of application ==
Above all, companies that process large amounts of granular data with high compliance requirements benefit from the analysis software. The decisive factor is the free combination of data attributes and characteristics. Due to the novel visualization of data, the software is used in particular in the area of data quality management. InfoZoom is used by the police and criminal authorities, in the energy sector and by financial service providers in the fight against crime by electronic search for clues in mobile phone data.

== Notes ==
- Fraunhofer Institute for Applied Information Technology: Visualization of Trees as Highly Compressed Tables with InfoZoom
- Artificial Intelligence in Medicine: Visualization and interactive analysis of blood parameters with InfoZoom
- Second International Conference on Data Mining: InfoZoom
