= Sampling risk =

Chance that sampled data is misleading

Sampling risk is a specific type of risk that auditors encounter when performing audit sampling procedures. Because examining 100% of a client's records is generally impractical and cost-prohibitive, auditors evaluate a representative sample of accounts instead. Due to the negative effects produced by sampling risk, an auditor may have to perform additional procedures which in turn can impact the overall efficiency of the audit.

Sampling risk represents the possibility that an auditor's conclusion based on a sample is different from that reached if the entire population were subject to audit procedure. The auditor may conclude that material misstatements exist, when in fact they do not; or material misstatements do not exist but in fact they do exist. Auditors can lower the sampling risk by increasing the sampling size.

Although there are many types of risks associated with the audit process, each type primarily has an effect on the overall audit engagement. The effects produced by sampling risk generally can increase audit risk, the risk that an entity's financial statements will contain a material misstatement, though given an unqualified ('clean') audit report. Sampling risk can also increase detection risk which suggests the possibility that an auditor will not find material misstatements relating to the financial statements through substantive tests and analysis.

== Types of sampling risk ==
=== Typical scenarios ===
Auditors must often make professional judgments in assessing sampling risk. When testing samples the auditor is primarily concerned with two aspects of sampling risk:

Risk of accepting incorrect data: the sample supports the conclusion that the recorded account balance is not materially misstated when it is materially misstated.

Risk of incorrect rejection: the risk that the sample supports the conclusion that the recorded amount balance is materially misstated when it is not materially misstated.

In addition, the auditor is concerned with sampling risk and its relationship with controls. Two types of sample risk/control risks are:

Assessing too low: the risk that the assessed level of control risk based on the sample is less than the true operating effectiveness of the control.

Assessing too high: the risk that the assessed level of control risk based on the sample is greater than the true operating effectiveness of the control.

== Sample selection ==
When selecting a sampling approach there are two approaches to audit sampling: non-statistical and statistical approach. Three ways that statistical sampling can assist the auditor are: to maximize the productivity with minimum wasted effort in designing the sample, to measure the sufficiency of the evidence taken during the audit, and to analyze the results. The statistical approach allows the auditor to measure the risk that is being sampled to help in reducing it to an acceptable level. With respect to performing samples, statistical sampling involves different kinds of costs such as training the auditors, designing individual samples to meet the requirements, and choosing the items to be examined. If there is insufficient audit evidence it is the responsibility of the auditor to choose between non statistical or the statistical sampling approaches considering their effectiveness and related costs.

Although exercising careful judgment is crucial during every step of the sampling process, it is extremely necessary when choosing the non-statistical approach. This method does not include the use of tables or statistical percentages, but rather it relies upon professional judgment on the part of the auditor as well as the policy implemented by the firm. Under this approach, it is common practice for most accounting firms to create universal guidelines for auditors in order to determine a proper sample size. For example, if a given client's control risk is high, a firm would typically require a high sample size when selecting records.

In order to successfully gather a sample, it is important to consider the collection as a whole and the relevance of the particular items. The most common successful method is to select an even number of items which accurately represents the list as a whole. Selecting only large or small numbers could distort the sample which creates risk.

== See also ==
- Sample (statistics)
- Audit
