= UN/CEFACT =

United Nations Centre for Trade Facilitation and Electronic Business

UN/CEFACT is the United Nations Centre for Trade Facilitation and Electronic Business. It was established as an intergovernmental body of the United Nations Economic Commission for Europe (UNECE) in 1996 and evolved from UNECE's long tradition of work in trade facilitation which began in 1957.

UN/CEFACT's goal is "Simple, Transparent and Effective Processes for Global Commerce." It aims to help business, trade and administrative organizations from developed, developing and transition economies to exchange products and services effectively. To this end, it focuses on simplifying national and international transactions by harmonizing processes, procedures and information flows related to these transactions, rendering these more efficient and streamlined, with the ultimate goal of contributing to the growth of global commerce.

== Trade facilitation and electronic business ==
UN/CEFACT focusses on two main areas of activity to make international trade processes more efficient and streamlined, namely: trade facilitation and electronic business.

Trade facilitation involves the simplification of trade procedures (or the elimination of unnecessary procedures). This includes work to standardize and harmonize the core information used in trade documents, to ease the flow of information between parties by relying on appropriate information and communication technology, and to promote simplified payment systems to foster transparency, accountability and cost-effectiveness.

Electronic business, in the UN/CEFACT context, focuses on harmonizing, standardizing and automating the exchange of information that controls the flow of goods along the international supply chain. UN/CEFACT's work on electronic business is driven by the understanding that goods cannot move faster than the processes and information that accompany them.

UN/CEFACT takes a total trade transaction approach to trade facilitation and associated electronic business, covering all the processes from initial placement of orders through to final payments. This is best illustrated through the UN/CEFACT Buy-Ship-Pay model of the international supply chain, which forms the basis of its work.

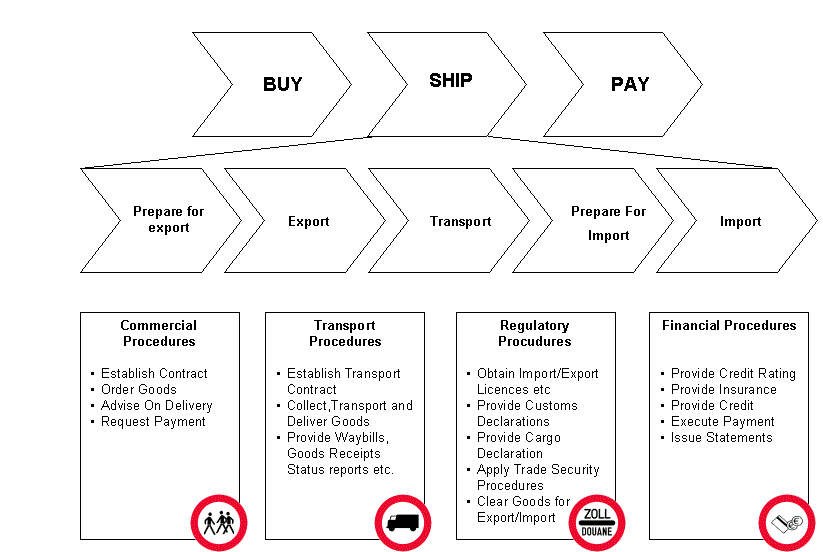
Buy Ship Pay model of the international supply chain

== Deliverables ==
UN/CEFACT has produced over 30 trade facilitation recommendations and a range of electronic business standards (collectively referred to as “instruments”) which are used throughout the world by both governments and the private sector. They reflect best practices in trade procedures and data and documentary requirements. The International Organization for Standardization (ISO) has adopted many of them as international standards.

UN/CEFACT Recommendations and Standards are implemented throughout the world. Some of the more well known instruments are:

Recommendation 1: United Nations Layout Key (UNLK) for Trade Documents. This provides an international basis for the standardized layout of documents used in international trade. The Layout Key facilitates the exchange of information between the various parties involved in a commercial transaction and is used as the basis for many key trade documents such as the European Union's Single Administrative Document (SAD); FIATA's Freight Forwarding Instruction; UNECE's Dangerous Goods Declaration; and the World Customs Organization (WCO) Goods Declaration for Export. Use of the UN Layout Key is specifically recommended in the WCO's Revised Kyoto Convention. The Layout Key is so widely used in international trade that many expect normal trade documents to conform to the Recommendation.

Recommendation 16: UN/LOCODE Code for Trade and Transport Locations provides an alphabetic code for seaports, airports, inland freight terminals and other customs clearance sites. Recommended by the International Maritime Organization (IMO), it is used by most major shipping companies and also by the universal Postal Union (UPU). UN/LOCODE's website is regularly visited, accounting for 6% of all “hits” to the UNECE website. The first issue of UN/LOCODE in 1981 provided codes to represent the names of some 8000 locations in the world. Today, UN/LOCODE, which is updated twice annually, contains almost 100 000 entries with strong demand for further updates and extension. Every recognised national and international airport or maritime port will have a UN/LOCODE coding.

Recommendation 25 and the UN/EDIFACT Standard represent a set of internationally agreed standards, directories, and guidelines for the electronic interchange of structured data, between independent computerized information systems. UN/EDIFACT is the international standard for electronic data interchange and is used throughout the commercial and administrative world. UN/EDIFACT accounts for over 90% of all electronic data interchange (EDI) messages exchanged globally. UN/EDIFACT messages are used by almost all national customs administrations, all major seaports and a large range of companies (including over 100 000 in the retail sector), and throughout international supply chains. For example, more than 7 million EDIFACT messages are exchanged each year in the French agricultural supply chain.

Recommendation 33 on Single Windows proposes that governments establish a Single Window facility that allows parties involved in trade and transport to lodge standardized information and documents with a single entry point to fulfil all import, export and transit-related regulatory requirements. A suite of complementary Single Window Recommendations has also been developed, namely Recommendation 34 on Data Simplification and Standardization and 35 on Establishing a Legal Framework for Single Windows.

A family of Supply Chain “Cross-Industry” messages are exchanged globally between trading partners covering the majority of business-to-business (B2B) electronic exchanges from order to payment. One of the key documents within this family is the Cross Industry Invoice (CII) which functions primarily as a request for payment, used as a key document for Value Added Tax (VAT) declaration and reclamation, for statistics declarations and to support export and import declarations in international trade.

The eDAPLOS message describes the data crop sheet exchanged between farmers and their partners. This message has allowed users to harmonize the definitions of technical data, develop consensual data dictionaries which can be used as a basis for all the steps of traceability and create a standardized Crop Data Sheet message. DAPLOS, which is based on the UN/CEFACT Core Component Library, has been adopted by 25 000 farmers and regional agriculture chambers in France and Belgium.

CITES (the Convention on International Trade in Endangered Species of Wild Fauna and Flora) has developed a version of their declaration using the Core Component Library of UN/CEFACT and has generated an XML message according to the specifications of UN/CEFACT. CITES is an international agreement between governments. Its aim is to ensure that international trade in specimens of wild animals and plants does not threaten their survival. The CITES declarations are used in customs clearance procedures in all countries around the globe.

=== UN Transparency Protocol ===
The UN Transparency Protocol (UNTP) is a UN/CEFACT global standard intended to support supply chain traceability and transparency, and to counter greenwashing by making sustainability claims digitally verifiable. The protocol defines a suite of interoperable digital credentials and discovery mechanisms, and sector implementation communities have been established for minerals and metals, agriculture and food, and textiles and fashion.

UNECE maintains public registers associated with the protocol, including a software implementer register that records software vendors which have committed to implementing it. As of August 2026 the specification was published as a work in progress, with version 1.0 expected by 1 September 2026.

== Benefits ==
Governments, traders and consumers all benefit from having simpler and more cost-effective trade procedures. UN/CEFACT's work is particularly relevant for developing countries, where the elimination of trade-related inefficiencies is many times more beneficial than the reduction or removal of tariff barriers to trade. In addition, UN/CEFACT's work is of particular benefit to landlocked countries and countries distant from major markets. These countries experience challenges and constraints resulting from complex and inefficient procedures, including the creation of many additional costs in bringing goods to market. The gains from this work are considerable for small and medium-sized enterprises, for which the costs of compliance with various trade-related procedures are proportionally higher. This is particularly true in the case of low-value shipments, where the cost of administrative procedures represents a large proportion of total cost.

== Structure ==
In view of the global character of its work on trade facilitation and electronic business standards, UN/CEFACT is open to representatives of all UN member states and all organisations recognized by the United Nations Economic and Social Council (ECOSOC). The participation of developing countries and countries in transition in standards development processes is strongly encouraged.

The highest authority regarding all aspects of UN/CEFACT's work is the intergovernmental Plenary which meets once a year in Geneva. Delegations to the Plenary include UN member states, intergovernmental organizations and non-governmental organizations (NGOs) recognized by the Economic and Social Council of the United Nations (ECOSOC). Only UN member states have the right to vote at Plenary meetings – all other members are observers.

The Plenary elects the UN/CEFACT Bureau which consists of a chair and at least four vice-chairs. The Bureau acts in the name of the Plenary between sessions and meets physically an average of four times per year and more frequently through virtual conference calls.

Each UN member state may nominate a permanent Head of Delegation (HOD) to UN/CEFACT. HODs participate in the Plenary, are consulted by the bureau on key strategic issues, and are responsible for nominating experts to participate in UN/CEFACT activities.

The technical work to develop UN/CEFACT standards and recommendations is done by over 200 volunteer experts from around the world, nominated by HODs. The experts come from both the public and the private sectors, forming a public-private partnership in support of trade facilitation and electronic business. They participate as independent volunteer experts in their own right, without representing any special interests of their countries or institutions. The experts are representatives from:

- Governments
- Private companies
- Intergovernmental organizations
- Industry associations (representing large collective groups of private-sector companies)
- Academia

UN/CEFACT experts meet physically in UN/CEFACT Forums, which are held twice a year (one in Geneva and one hosted by a UN member state) in order to coordinate their work. The vast majority of the work is done virtually between forums.

UNECE provides secretarial support to UN/CEFACT in order that the Centre may implement its programme of work. Annually, the UN/CEFACT Bureau (acting on behalf of the Plenary) and the UNECE Secretariat plan for the implementation of UN/CEFACT's programme of work, taking into account the resources available from both the United Nations and externally. The secretariat takes responsibility for supporting the work of UN/CEFACT including supporting the maintenance of Recommendations and standards; and handles the administrative functions related to UN/CEFACT, including UN oversight, organizing meetings and preparing official documents and papers. The technical work of standards development is undertaken by the UN/CEFACT experts.

Some important users of UN/CEFACT norms, standards and recommendations

- Governments of Australia, Canada, France and New Zealand: for agricultural trade certificates
- Government of Canada: for its air cargo security initiative
- Government of France: for eArchiving, the transfer of digital records and public procurement (all under current development)
- Government of India: for its ports management system
- Government of the Republic of Korea: for public procurement services
- Government of the United States of America: for defence contract compliance reporting and for material safety data sheets (the latter being used in transport of dangerous goods)
- Governments of Central Asian and South East European (SEE) countries: for Single Window capacity-building and implementation
- Asia Pacific Economic Cooperation and Association of Southeast Asian Nations and the Government of India: for development of electronic trade documents
- Southeast European countries: for work on customs corridors
- World Customs Organization and numerous national Customs administrations, S.W.I.F.T and ISO 20022 (Finance): for data formats and definitions
- World Trade Organization negotiators on trade facilitation: as examples of relevant standards and recommendations particularly for aligned documents and Single Windows
- Global Standards 1 (GS1): for all trade messages (with approximately 110,000 companies having implemented these)
- International insurance industry: for coverage and claims
- European gas and electricity industries: for information exchange
- Japanese construction industry: for e-tendering
- Japanese tourism industry: for rental of small-scale lodging houses
- European transport companies: for the exchange of short sea-transport information
- Numerous Governments in both developed and developing countries: for aligned documents
- Most shipping companies, container operators, terminal operators and others in the maritime shipping industry: for almost all maritime shipping messages through EDIFACT messages.

== The UN/CEFACT electronic data forms ==
The following 94 forms are until May 2014 (version D13B), developed by UN/CEFACT. In September 2017, this was increased to 123 forms (XML Schemas)

- AAA Accounting Entry Message
- AAA Accounting Journal List Message
- AAA Accounting Message
- AAA Bundle Collection Message
- AAA Chart Of Accounts Message
- AAA Ledger Message
- AAA Reporting Message
- AAA Trial Balance Message
- Acknowledgement
- Agronomical Observation Report
- Animal Inspection Message
- Contract Summary Data
- Cost Data
- Cost Schedule
- Crop Data Sheet Message
- Cross Border Livestock
- Cross Industry Catalogue
- Cross Industry Demand Forecast Response
- Cross Industry Demand Forecast
- Cross Industry Despatch Advice
- Cross Industry Inventory Forecast
- Cross Industry Invoice
- Cross Industry Order Change
- Cross Industry Order Response
- Cross Industry Order
- Cross Industry Quotation Proposal Response
- Cross Industry Quotation Proposal
- Cross Industry Remittance Advice
- Cross Industry Request For Quotation Response
- Cross Industry Request For Quotation
- Cross Industry Supply Instruction
- Cross Industry Supply Notification
- Data Specification Profile
- Data Specification Query
- Data Specification Request
- Data Specification
- Electronic Animal Passport Message
- Electronic Data Exchange Proxy
- Examination Result Notification
- FLUX ACDR Message
- FLUX Response Message
- FLUX Vessel Position Message
- Funding Data
- Invitation To Tender
- Laboratory Observation Report
- Letter Of Invitation To Tender
- Lodging House Information Request
- Lodging House Information Response
- Lodging House Reservation Request
- Lodging House Reservation Response
- Lodging House Travel Product Information
- Material Safety Data Sheet
- MSI Request
- MSI
- Network Schedule
- Prequalification Application
- Project Artefact Profile
- Project Artefact Query
- Project Artefact Request
- Project Artefact
- Qualification Application
- Qualification Result Notice
- RASFF Notification Message
- Reception Of Prequalification Application
- Reception Of Qualification Application
- Reception Of Registration Application
- Reception Of Request For Tender Information
- Reception Of Response Of Tender Guarantee
- Reception Of Tender Guarantee
- Reception Of Tender
- Registration Application
- Reporting Calendar Data
- Report Structure
- Request For Tender Information
- Resourcing Data
- Response Of Tender Guarantee
- Schedule Calendar Data
- SPSAcknowledgement
- SPSCertificate
- Tender Guarantee
- Tender Information
- Tender Result Notice
- Tender
- Thresholds
- TMW Cancellation Message
- TMW Certificate Of Waste Receipt Message
- TMW Certificate Of Waste Recovery Disposal Message
- TMW Confirmation Of Message Receipt Message
- TMW Movement Announcement Message
- TMW Notification Acknowledgement Message
- TMW Notification Decision Message
- TMW Notification Submission Message
- TMW Request For Further Notification Information Message
- TMW Transport Statement Message

== See also ==
- UN/CEFACT's Modeling Methodology
- Core Component Technical Specification
- ebXML
- OASIS (organization)
- XBRL GL (General Ledger)
- SIE (file format)
- UNeDocs
