= Court of Audit =

Supreme government institution for executive accountability

A Court of Audit or Court of Accounts is a supreme audit institution, i.e. a government institution performing financial and/or legal audit (i.e. statutory audit or external audit) on the executive branch of power.

Courts of Audit
Country	Name	Est.	Independent	Can start legal action
Algeria	Cour des comptes (Algérie)	1976		
Angola	Tribunal de Contas			
Australia	Australian National Audit Office			
Austria	Rechnungshof	1920	Yes	
Bangladesh	Office of the Comptroller and Auditor General (OCAG)			
Belgium	Cour des comptes / Rekenhof / Rechnungshof			
Benin	Cour des comptes (Bénin)			
Brazil	Tribunal de Contas da União			
Bulgaria	Smetna palata			
Canada	Office of the Auditor General of Canada	1878	Yes	
European Union	the European Court of Auditors or ECA			
France	Cour des comptes		partially	No
Germany	Bundesrechnungshof	1950	Yes	No
Greece	Ελεγκτικό Συνέδριο	1829	Yes	
Indonesia	Badan Pemeriksa Keuangan	1946		
Ireland	Comptroller and Auditor General	1923	Yes	
Italy	Corte dei Conti			
Ivory Coast	Cour des comptes			
Japan	Board of Audit		Yes	
Luxemburg	Lëtzebuerger Cour des comptes			
Morocco	Court of Accounts		Yes	
Moldova	Curtea de Conturi (Moldova)			
Netherlands	Algemene Rekenkamer			
Norway	Riksrevisjonen			
Philippine	Philippine Commission on Audit			
Portugal	Tribunal de Contas			
Romania	Curtea de Conturi	1973	Yes	Yes
Russia	Счётная палата			
Slovenia	Računsko sodišče			
Spain	Tribunal de Cuentas			
Sweden	Riksrevisionen			
Switzerland	Swiss Federal Audit Office			
Tunisia	Cour des comptes (Tunisia)			
Taiwan (Republic of China)	審計部 (National Audit Office)	1931	Yes	Yes
Turkey	Sayıştay	1862	Yes	No
Ukraine	Рахункова палата			
United Kingdom	National Audit Office			
United States	Government Accountability Office			
Uruguay	Tribunal de Cuentas	1934		

== See also ==
- Most of those institutions are INTOSAI members, International Organization of Supreme Audit Institutions.
- Government audit, Government performance auditing, Performance audit
