= Hussam bin Abdulmohsen Alangari =

Saudi Arabian judge

His Excellency Dr. Hussam bin Abdulmohsen Alangari
- حسام بن عبدالمحسن العنقري
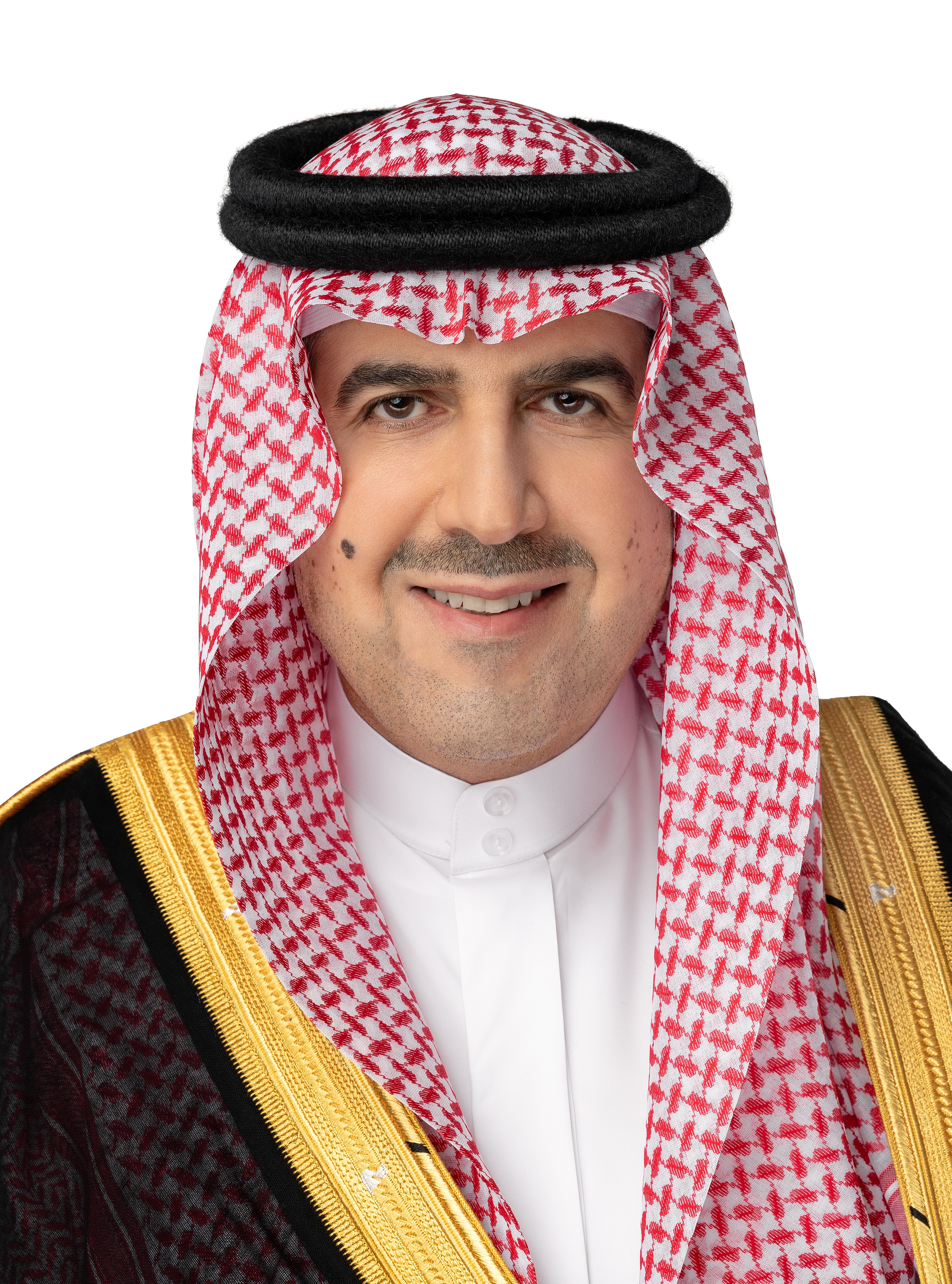
- Hussam Alangari in 2024

President of the General Court of Audit
- In office May 7, 2016 – Present
- Monarch: King Salman of Saudi Arabia

Personal details
- Born: Riyadh, Saudi Arabia
- Citizenship: Saudi
- Spouse: Latifa bint Muhammad bin Mallouh
- Children: Abdulmohsen, Aljawhara, and Sultana
- Parents: Abdulmohsen bin Abdulaziz Alangari (father); Aljawhara bint Abdulrahman Alsuwailem (mother)
- Education: University of Essex
- Occupation: President of the General Court of Audit

Hussam bin Abdulmohsen Alangari was appointed as the President of the General Court of Audit (GCA) by Royal Decree in May 2016.

== Transformative leadership in the GCA ==
Since assuming his role, Dr. Alangari has led a transformative restructuring of the General Court of Audit aimed at strengthening its independence, building its professional capacity, and enhancing its capabilities. This initiative resulted in the issuance of a royal decree that changed its name from the "General Audit Bureau" to the "General Court of Audit" and amended several articles of its bylaws. The amendments elevated the reporting structure of the GCA to the King, and granted it legal personality, along with financial and administrative independence. This was succeeded by the adoption of a revised organizational structure and updated financial and administrative regulations.

Dr. Alangari has led the transition of public sector audits following the national transformation project from cash to accrual basis of accounting, including the audit of the first consolidated financial statements of the Kingdom. Under his leadership, comprehensive audit methodologies were developed in accordance with the International Standards of Supreme Audit Institutions (ISSAIs) and best practices. The implementation of these methodologies is facilitated by an advanced electronic audit platform (Shamel).

The Shamel audit platform was introduced during the leadership of Dr. Alangari, and later upgraded to Shamel 2.0, as part of GCA's digital transformation. Shamel incorporates AI-driven audit techniques and data analytics tools, and integrates with several government platforms, providing real-time data and streamlining communication between the GCA and its auditees.

Dr. Alangari has also prioritized human capital and established the Human Excellence and Motivation Hub (HEMH), which aims to elevate staff performance through objective, technology-driven assessments and development programs.

The initiatives undertaken by Dr. Alangari is set to greatly enhance financial oversight in the Kingdom, and thus promoting accountability and transparency, in line with Saudi Vision 2030.

== Regional and international contributions ==
Internationally, Dr. Alangari has been a strong advocate for the independence of Supreme Audit Institutions (SAIs), actively promoting best practices in public sector auditing, governance, and accountability. He holds significant roles in the International Organization of Supreme Audit Institutions (INTOSAI), including Second Vice-Chair, Chair of the Policy, Finance, and Administration Committee (PFAC), and Co-Chair of the INTOSAI-Donor Steering Committee (IDSC). He is also a member of the INTOSAI Development Initiative (IDI) Board, Chair of the Arab Organization for Supreme Audit Institutions (ARABOSAI), and a member of the Governing Board of the Asian Organization of Supreme Audit Institutions (ASOSAI). In addition, Dr. Alangari serves as a member of the Global Board of Directors of the Institute of Internal Auditors (IIA). Domestically, he is the Chairman of the Board of Directors of the Saudi Authority of Internal Auditors and is the President of the Arab Confederation for Institutes of Internal Auditors.

His contributions have advanced SAIs autonomy and effectiveness, particularly in developing countries, where he has provided institutional support and capacity-building resources through initiatives aligned with the United Nations Development Program. These efforts have reinforced the role of SAIs in monitoring the Sustainable Development Goals (SDGs), setting new benchmarks for transparency and efficacy globally.

== Professional background ==
Dr. Alangari received his Doctoral Degree in Accounting and Financial Management from the University of Essex in the UK in 2000. Subsequently, based on his extensive research record, he was promoted to Full Professor at King Abdulaziz University in Saudi Arabia in 2008. During his tenure, he served as a lecturer and academic scholar, as well as Dean of both the College of Economics and Administration and the College of Law. Additionally, he was appointed as a chair or member of various boards and committees within the private and public sectors, as well as local and regional professional bodies.

Following his academic career, Dr. Alangari was appointed by Royal Decree as a member of Shura Council (the Saudi Parliament) for a four-year term from 2013 to 2016. During this time, he was elected Vice-Chair of the Financial Committee for the first two years and then Chair for the third and fourth years. He submitted five proposals for new laws and amendments to existing laws based on Article 23 of Shura Council Law, all of which were accepted for further study by the council. la
