= Audit Chamber of Armenia =

- Հայաստանի Հաշվեքննիչ պալատ
- Audit Chamber of Armenia logo
- Formation: May 29, 1996; 30 years ago
- Type: Audit institution
- Headquarters: 19 Baghramyan Avenue, Yerevan
- Region served: Armenia
- Chairman: Atom Janjughazyan
- Affiliations: EUROSAI; INTOSAI
- Website: armsai.am

The Audit Chamber of Armenia (Armenian: Հայաստանի Հաշվեքննիչ պալատ, romanized: Hayastani Hashvek’nnich’ palat) is an independent agency of the government of Armenia which has separate powers and responsibilities. It is headquartered in Armenia's capital, Yerevan. It is a full member of the European Organization of Supreme Audit Institutions and the International Organization of Supreme Audit Institutions.

== History ==
Following Armenia's independence in 1991, a state financial and economic system was required that was able to sustain the benefits to both state and society under the conditions of a liberal economy. Meanwhile, it was necessary to create a new legislative field to determine the financial control principles and approaches. One such institution was the Control Chamber of the National Assembly of Armenia; a new system of state financial control. This external state control performing structure was founded on May 29, 1996. The founder president of Control Chamber was D.Sc., professor Ashot Tavadyan. A few main objectives of Control Chamber were to exercise comprehensive and professional control over the effective spending of state revenues and funds ensuring transparency of their usage. The next major function of the Control Chamber was the analyzes of presented reports.

The Control Chamber of Armenia was formed by the National Assembly and was accountable to the country's legislative body. The Chamber was submitting to the National Assembly semiannual references, control progress reports, annual plans and reports of the Chamber's activities, thus making its study results public. The principles of the RA NA Control Chamber activity were those of independence, collegiality and publicity. It was performing its activities on its own, independently from the bodies of power being guided by the principles of the Lima declaration, as well as by those of INTOSAI (International Organization of Supreme Audit Institutions). Control Chamber's first steps were directed towards the determination of its structural-functional divisions, professional departments and fields of activity. According to the Charter approved by the National Assembly, State Budget, Privatisation and Denationalisation; Foreign Loans and Credits; the Comprehensive-Analytical and Informational-Methodological were operating within the Chamber of Control. Later with the amendments to the Charter, the number of Control Chamber departments was increased by one with the addition of the Department of Control Over Community Budgets.

During 2002–2007 a number of important events took place in the Control Chamber: 54.6% of the expenditure part of the RA state budget started to be controlled, instead of the previous 20%, the CoC performed joint audits with the Accounts Chamber of the Russian Federation, the Control Chamber became a member of the INTOSAI Working Group on Environmental Auditing. As a result of this cooperation 10 standards of external state sphere control, as well as financial and industrial control manuals, were developed. During the same years a new INTRANET system of document circulation management and computer information system was installed. Since 2007, the Control Chamber issues, every quarter, an official handbook containing their reports and conclusions illustrating the progress of all work undertaken. As a result of the Constitutional changes, there was necessity to bring in a new law on "RA Control Chamber". On December 25, 2006, the National Assembly adopted a new law on the Chamber (ratified on June 9, 2007) and came into force from the tenth day succeeding the coming into effect of the Constitution's 83.4 article. The RA Control Chamber, which is the legal successor of the RA NA Control Chamber, in comparison with the previous one, has a number of distinctive features which relate to the state, functions and authority of the Chamber: under the new legislation, the CoC chairman is being appointed by the NA upon the proposal of the RA president for a six-year term and the CoC Council, besides the chairman and the deputy, consists of a further 5 members. If previously the National Assembly was approving the CoC annual plan and report, under the new law the NA takes notice of the report on annual activity, and approves the plan, like in the previous case. On the basis of the new legal requirements, structural changes have been made in the Chamber: The departments have been reformed on a functional basis and a number of new divisions have been added (e.g. the department of internal control). Such working dynamics does not rule out the possibility of future CoC structural changes.

== Tasks ==
The Control Chamber has the following tasks:

- to submit to the National Assembly of Armenia the results of auditing and the information whereof to the Government;
- to submit to the National Assembly of Armenia audit conclusions on:

1. the Annual Statement of the Government on the implementation of the State Budget; the Statement of the Government on the implementation of the Annual Program of the Privatization and Denationalization of state enterprises and projects of unfinished construction;

2. the Annual Statement of the Central Bank;

- to submit, at the beginning of each half-year, to the deputies of the National Assembly of Armenia of a certificate on the implementation, during the -preceding half-year, of the State Budget, the use of loans and credits obtained from other states and international organizations, on the course of implementation of the program of privatization and denationalization;
- to render methodological and professional assistance to committees and deputies of the National Assembly.

== COC Staff ==
=== Chairman of the RA Control Chamber ===
According to the Article 116 of Constitution of Armenia, the chairman of the Control Chamber shall be appointed by the National Assembly upon the recommendation of the president of the Republic for a six- year term. Any person complying with the requirements for the deputy can be appointed chairman of the Control Chamber. The same person may not be elected for the post of chairman of the Control Chamber for more than two consecutive terms.

On November 12, during sitting of the RA National Assembly, by result of secret voting, Iskhan Zakaryan was appointed chairman of the RA Control Chamber. According to the 83.4 article of Constitution of Armenia, the candidacy of Iskhan Zakaryan had been nominated to the National Assembly by the president of Armenia.

=== Chief of staff ===
Artavazd Nersisyan is an engineer, power engineering specialist. He was born in 1962, in Yerevan. He graduated from the Polytechnic Institute after K. Marx. He started his career in "Hayaviahamalir" (Armaviacomplex) Production Complex as an engineer, then was elected as the secretary of the Young Communists Committee of the same Complex and worked at the Spandaryan District Committee of the Young Communists of Armenia. Then He worked in "Armimpexbank" as a department head, at the Yerevan gold factory as a deputy director, in the Sport Committee of the RA as a department head. From 2008 he works in the RA CoC as the counsellor to the chairman of CoC, then as the Deputy Head of the Third Department. He was the head of the Fourth Department in 2009. He was appointed as chief of staff at CoC in 2013.

== Departments ==
=== First Department ===
The First Department administrates control over the activity of the RA Ministry of Finance, the RA Ministry of Economy, the RA State Income Committee adjunct to the Government; it draws conclusions on the annual report of the RA Government on the implementation of the state budget.

=== Second Department ===
The Second Department administrates control over the activity of the credit programs and grants, the Social Investment Fund of Armenia, Armenian Development Agency, as well as the Central Bank and commercial banks of the RA, it draws a conclusion on the annual report of the Central Bank of the RA.

=== Third Department ===
The Third Department administrates control over the community budgets, including dotations and subventions allocated to the communities and over the usage of the community property.

=== Fifth Department ===
The Fifth department administrates control over the activity of the RA Ministry of Agriculture, the RA Ministry of Environmental Protection, the RA Ministry of Transport and Communication, the RA National Statistical Service, the RA Ministry of Healthcare.

=== Sixth Department ===
The Sixth Department administrates control over the activity of the RA Ministry of Urban Development, the RA State Committee on Water Economy, the RA Ministry of Energy and National Resources, the RA General Department of Civil Aviation adjunct to the RA Government.

=== Seventh Department ===
The Seventh Department administrates control over the activity of the RA Ministry of Education and Science, the RA Ministry of Culture, the RA Ministry of Sports and Youth Affairs, the RA Civil Service Council, the RA Ministry of Labour and Social Affairs, the RA Council of Public Television and Radio Company, the RA National Committee on Television and Radio.

=== Ninth Department ===
The Ninth Department administrates control over the activity of the RA Ministry of Defense, the RA Police adjunct to the Government, the RA Ministry of Justice, the RA National Security Service adjunct to the Government, the RA Ministry of Emergency Situations.

=== Tenth Department ===
The Tenth Department administrates control over the activity of the RA Constitutional Court, the RA President's Staff, the RA National Assembly's Staff, the RA Government's Staff, the RA Ministry of Foreign Affairs, the RA Judicial Department, the RA Prosecution Office.

=== Methodology and International Affairs Department ===
The department provides methodological support: it develops control benchmarks and procedural instructions, supervises their implementation. It gives professional opinion on control plans and progress reports written as a result of the control implementation. It draws annual plan and annual report of the Control Chamber activity. It develops and implements the policy and strategy directed to information technologies of the Control Chamber, ensures mutual relations between Control Chamber and its staff and the competent bodies of foreign countries and the international organizations.

=== Analysis Department ===
The Analysis Department performs analytical works in the scope of control performed by the Control Chamber, as well as out of that scope, summarizes the conclusion drafts on the annual reports of the RA Government and RA Central Bank related to the implementation of state budget and privatization project.

=== Legal Department ===
The Legal Department provides professional opinion on the legal substantiation of the current reports written during the control implementation, performs legal examination of the CoC acts, represents and defends the interests of CoC in the judicial and other state bodies, based on the decision of the council may be involved in the control process performed by the Control Chamber, provides legal counseling to the CoC management and staff.

=== COC in Constitution ===
According to the Article 83.4 The Control Chamber of the Republic of Armenia shall be an independent body, which shall oversee the use of the budget resources and the state and community property. The action plan of the Control Chamber shall be approved by the National Assembly. The Control Chamber shall at least once a year submit a report on the oversight outcomes to the National Assembly. The law shall define the regulations on the procedure and powers of the Control Chamber. The chairman of the Control Chamber shall be appointed by the National Assembly upon the recommendation of the president of the Republic for a six- year term. Any person complying with the requirements for the deputy can be appointed chairman of the Control Chamber. The same person may not be elected for the post of chairman of the Control Chamber for more than two consecutive terms.

== Legislation ==
=== Peculiarities of The New Law ===
The new law, adopted in on December 25, 2006, was associated with the amendments and addendums to the RA Constitution. The law was developed in compliance with the standards of the International Organisation of the Supreme Audit Institutions, with the clauses of the Lima declaration of "Guidelines on Auditing Precepts" and with the international supreme audit practice.

According to the CoC law, the current RA Control Chamber is more independent, has separated from the RA National Assembly and has a new status. The chairman of the Control Chamber is being appointed by the National Assembly upon the proposal of the Republic of Armenia President for a six-year term, unlike the previous chairmen who were proposed by the NA Chairman and approved by the NA. The same person shall not be appointed as a chairman of the Control Chamber for two terms in succession. The National Assembly discusses the annual report made up from the control results undertaken by the Control Chamber without rendering a decision; previously if it was not approved, the NA could express mistrust to the chairman of the Control Chamber. Furthermore, the Control Chamber, out of the annual activity plan, on the basis of the council's decision, may perform out-of-plan control. The Control Chamber performs control in the terms of observations, checks, cross checks, analyses, as well as by the types of financial, compliance, efficiency (performance) and environmental audits. From the mentioned above the efficiency and environmental audit types should be especially distinguished, as will be applied in Armenia for the first time. We can also distinguish the authority of the Control Chamber to perform cross checks. n the new law, the control authorities applied by the Control Chamber have been broadened and clarified. The Control Chamber may exercise control over both outflows and inflows of the state, community and mandatory social security budgets, however by different procedures. From now on, the Control Chamber will have time limitation in terms of control implementation. So, the period for exercising audit in the controlled object will be set not longer than 24 working days, which may be prolonged during the audit for not more than 12 working days based on the decision of the Control Chamber Council. The period for cross checks will be set not longer than 12 working days, which may be extended for no longer than 6 working days based on the order of the Control Chamber Chairman.

== International cooperation ==
The Audit Chamber of Armenia maintains several cooperation agreements with various other audit institutions including from Russia, China, Germany, the Netherlands, France, Sweden, the United Arab Emirates, Georgia, Belarus, Poland, Latvia, Bulgaria, Moldova, among others. The Audit Chamber also cooperates with international organizations such as the World Bank, the EU Delegation to Armenia, the German Corporation for International Cooperation, the United States Agency for International Development, EU/OECD joint initiative, United Nations Development Programme, and with the CIS and the EAEU.

== See also ==
- Politics of Armenia
- Supreme audit institution
