= Matanyahu Englman =

State Comptroller of Israel

- מתניהו אנגלמן
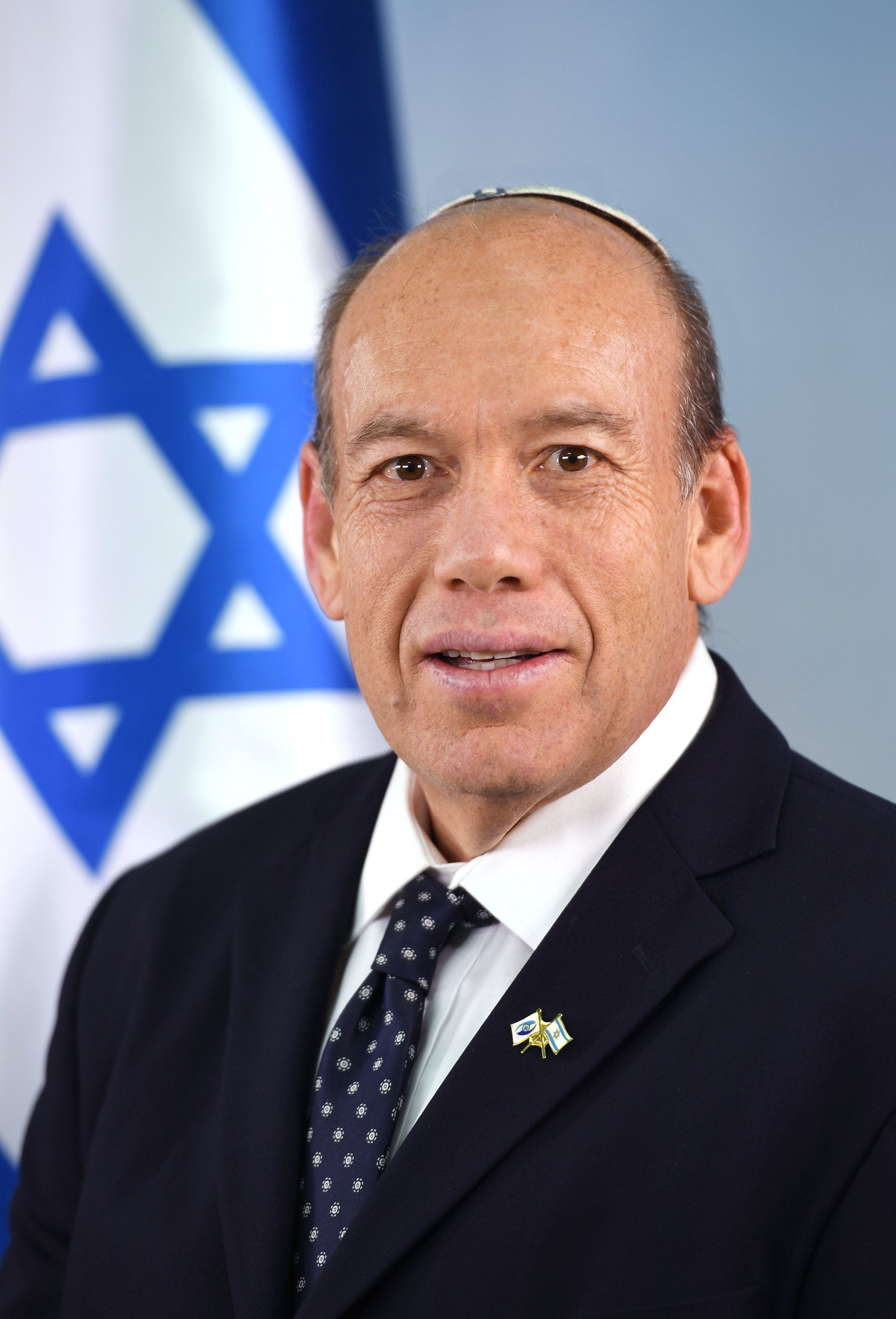

State Comptroller of Israel
- Incumbent
- Assumed office June 3, 2019
- Preceded by: Yosef Shapira

Personal details
- Born: 8 June 1966 (age 60) Jerusalem, Israel

Matanyahu Englman (Hebrew: מתניהו אנגלמן; born 8 June 1966) was the State Comptroller and Ombudsman of Israel in 2019–2026. He was also president of the European Organization of Supreme Audit Institutions (EUROSAI) from 2024 to 2026, after serving as vice president for 3 years.

== Biography ==
Matanyahu Englman was born in Jerusalem to Chasia and Binyamin (Robert) Englman, and grew up in Rehovot. His father was a physicist at the Soreq Institute. His maternal grandfather was Yehuda Kiel, who was awarded the Israel Prize in Jewish Studies in 1992 for his commentary on the Bible. Englman earned a BA in economics and accounting and an MA in business administration from the Hebrew University of Jerusalem.

Englman is married to Avigail, a social worker, daughter of former Governor of the Bank of Israel Moshe Mandelbaum. They live in Nof Ayalon and have six children. Englman is a marathon runner who has participated in seven marathons.

== Accounting career ==
From 1991 to 1999, Englman worked as a CPA for Fahn, Kanneh & Co., a member firm of Grant Thornton International.

== Public service career ==
From 1999 to 2005, Englman was Deputy Director General of the Jerusalem College of Engineering. From 2004 to 2017, Englman served as Audit Committee Director of Joint Israel and its affiliated organizations. From 2005 to 2010, he was CEO of the Shoham Local Council. In 2010, he was appointed Deputy Director-General of the Technion – Israel Institute of Technology. In 2014, he was promoted to Executive Vice President and Director-General. During 2018 and 2019, he served as CEO of the Council for Higher Education in Israel.

Englman was elected by the Knesset to the office of State Comptroller in June 2019, defeating Giora Romm in a secret ballot. He took office on 4 July 2019. Englman was the first non-judge to be elected to the oversight role in over three decades and described as having a less-activist, more conservative approach to the position.

In September 2019, it was reported that Englman re-approved Benjamin Netanyahu's request to receive a 2 million shekel loan for his legal defense from an American businessman. The decision was criticized by the Movement for Quality Government in Israel. Englman's predecessor, Yosef Shapira, had agreed to approve the loan if it was at market rates and there was no conflict of interest. In 2020, following the recommendation of the Attorney General of Israel, the State Comptroller's ministerial permissions committee denied Netanyahu's funding request, deeming it an improper gift to a government official.

== EUROSAI ==
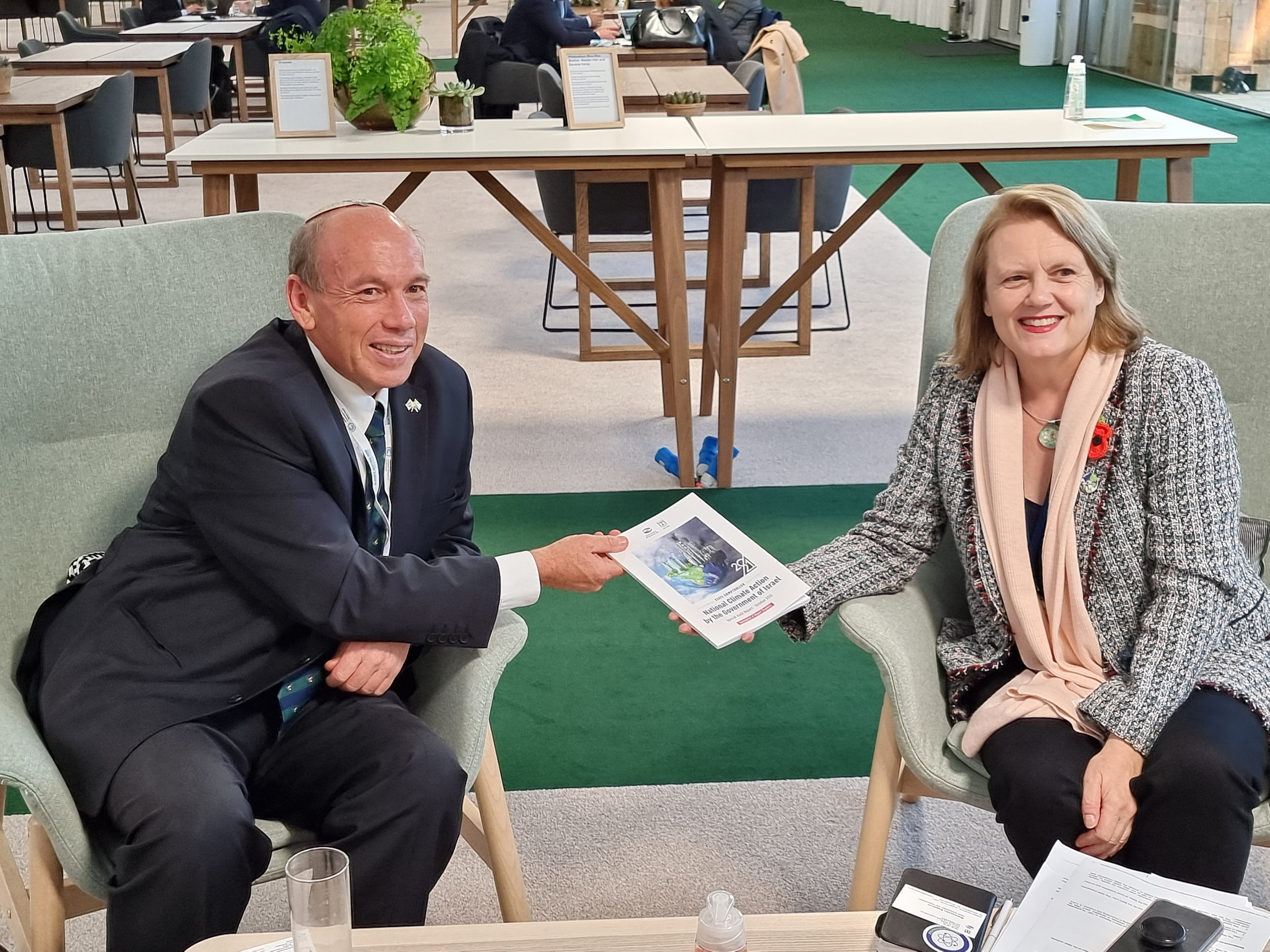
Englman with Janet Rogan, Britain's Regional Ambassador to the Middle East and Africa, November 2021

In April 2021, at the EUROSAI Congress in Prague, Englman was elected the next president of the organization. In his acceptance speech, he pledged to "work in the spirit of the organization to promote auditing practices that are contemporary, relevant, professional, enterprising, progressive and innovative, for the public good." As vice president of EUROSAI, he co-authored a report with SAI from other countries about the need for a change in the global workforce, which set goals for the coming year.

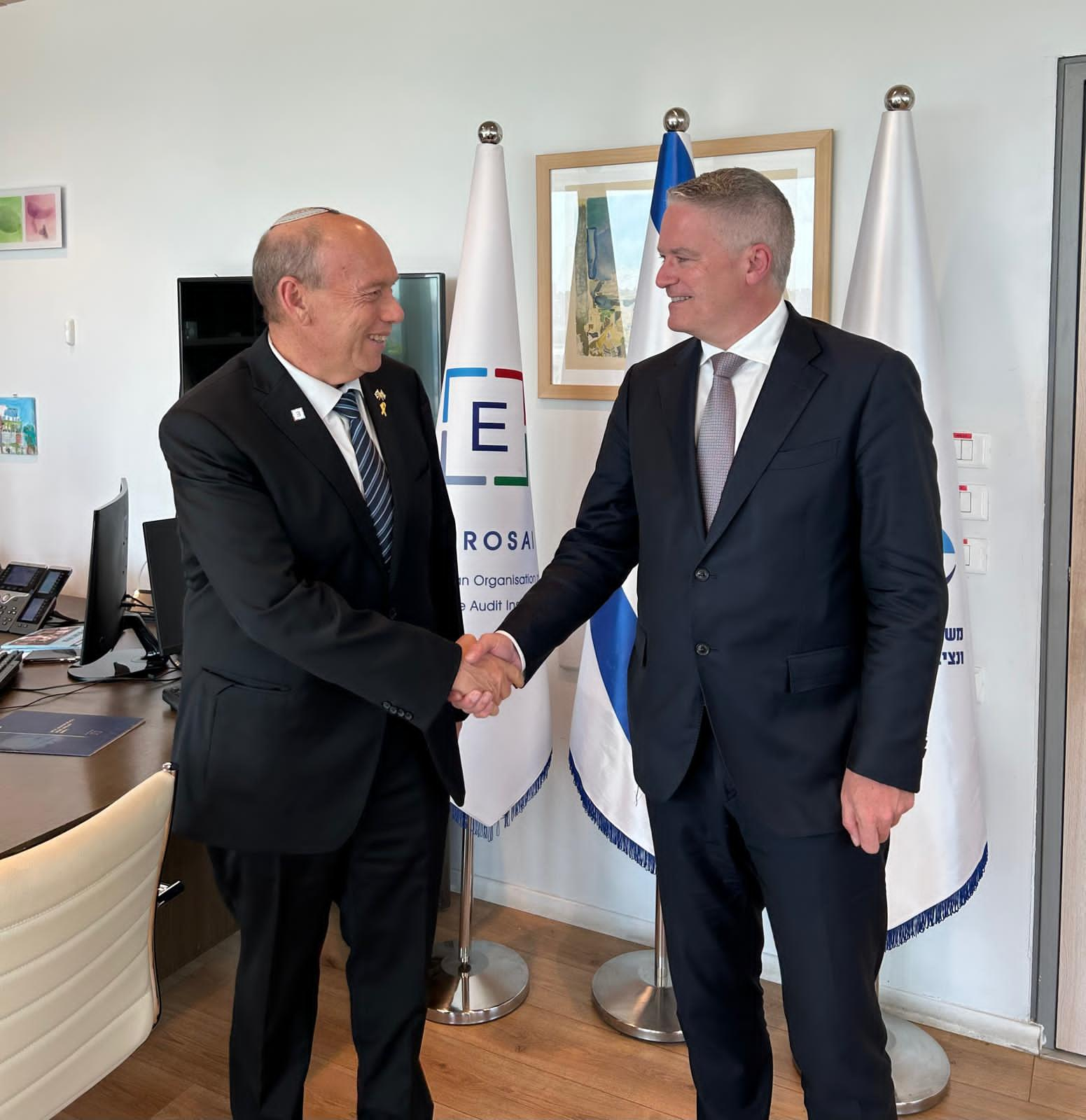
Englman meeting with OECD Secretary General, Jerusalem

In May 2024, Englman became the first Israeli state auditor to be elected president of EUROSAI and the only senior public official then heading an international organization. During the inauguration ceremony, Englman expressed his gratitude to EUROSAI for electing him and pledged to uphold good governance and the prevention of corruption. He assumed office during the XII EUROSAI Congress, which was hosted online from Jerusalem, with Englman delivering the opening address. The event was covered by international and Israeli media, which noted the significance of Israel assuming the EUROSAI presidency for the first time.

As President of EUROSAI, Englman represented the organization in international forums. Under his leadership, EUROSAI activities continued with the 63rd Governing Board meeting hosted by the UK National Audit Office in London (October 2024) and the 64th Governing Board meeting hosted by the Swedish National Audit Office in Stockholm (June 2025), both focusing on implementation of the EUROSAI Strategic Plan and professional cooperation among European SAIs.

In January 2025, Englman participated as EUROSAI President in the OECD Meeting of Auditors-General and Heads of Supreme Audit Institutions in Paris, which addressed the role of SAIs in fiscal sustainability, performance auditing, and governance challenges. In September 2025, he visited Paraguay, where he delivered keynote lectures at the National Congress on sustainability and climate change, and later met with senior audit officials. Englman also attended the 25th International Congress of Supreme Audit Institutions (INCOSAI) held in October 2025 in Sharm El Sheikh, Egypt, and the which brought together heads of supreme audit institutions worldwide.

At the conclusion of the final EUROSAI Governing Board meeting held under Englman's presidency in Rome in May 2026, European audit leaders paid tribute to him with a standing ovation. During his term, Englman promoted cooperation among supreme audit institutions, the use of peer review, knowledge-sharing and the responsible integration of artificial intelligence. In his farewell speech, he shared his view that auditing "must have a professional brain, but it must always have a human heart. Behind every audit report, there are always people.”

== Audit reports ==
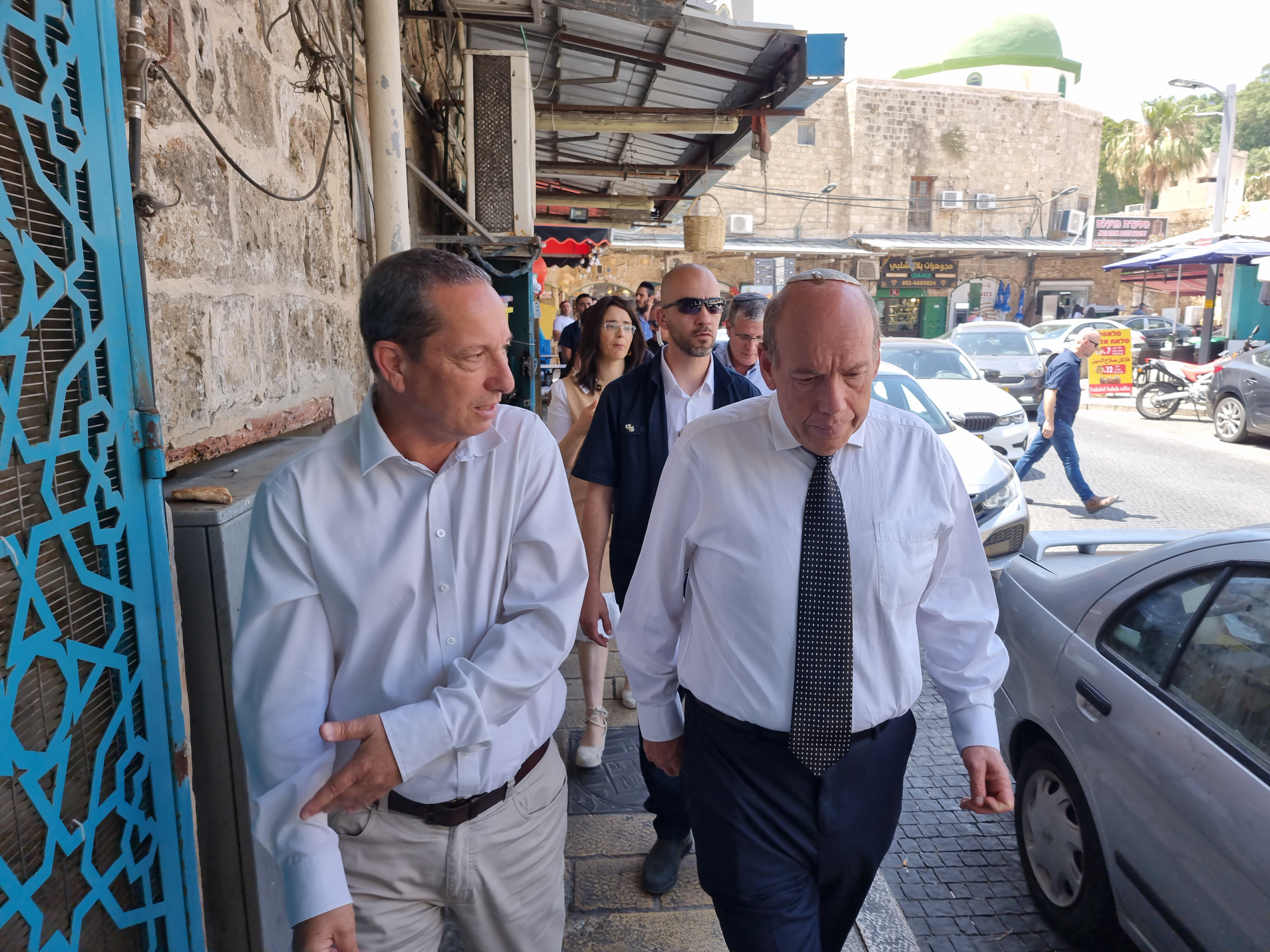
Englman visiting Akko prior to submitting report on Operation Guardian of the Walls, May 2021

In preparation for submitting his first reports in December 2019, Engelman announced a change of format to make the reports more accessible to the public. The reports were short and concise, focusing on ten main findings, and incorporated the use of infographics. Englman published 107 reports in 2020 and 108 reports in 2021. These reports covered a wide variety of topics, with a special emphasis on climate and cyber security. In 2021, Englman warned that a chronic shortage of skilled employees in the Israeli high-tech sector posed a strategic threat to the high-tech industry and Israeli economy. Based on his findings, he also claimed that Israel was unprepared for a climate crisis, which could lead to shortages of food and water, economic decline, and public health issues. In May 2023, Englman announced a follow-up audit on the climate issue ahead of a special session of state comptrollers at the COP28 in Abu Dhabi in October.

In August 2020, Englman issued a report criticizing the Mossad for growing far beyond its approved budget in recent years.

In October 2020, Englman recommended the end of Shin Bet surveillance of citizens infected with Coronavirus in a position that was at odds with the policy of Binyamin Netanyahu, although he avoided challenging the prime minister directly.

In his report on the performance of law enforcement and security forces during the riots in Israel's mixed cities during Operation Guardian of the Walls in May 2021, Englman found major deficiencies in the handling of these incidents. His recommendations included teaching Arabic to Israel Police officers and hiring more Arab municipal workers in the mixed cities. He urged the prosecutor's office to take action against those involved in violating public order on racial or nationalist grounds and recommended a restructuring of intelligence sharing. He also announced a special audit into the stampede at Mount Meron in northern Israel, where 45 people were crushed to death, but a month later called it off on the grounds that the Israeli Supreme Court inquiry was sufficient.

In January 2024, Englman published a special 5-chapter report on the cost of living in Israel, studying such issues as price controls in the food sector and lack of preparedness for inflation. Englman criticized the Finance Ministry's lack of contingency plans.

In a comprehensive report released in March 2024, Englman criticized the government's failure to reduce greenhouse gas emissions and adopt preventative measures to address climate change after a report in 2021 citing many deficiencies.

In April 2024, Englman reported that extravagant sums had been spent on renovating and bolstering the security of the homes of Israel's prime ministers in recent years, calling it a "waste of public funds."

In 2024, Englman reported on Israel’s national preparedness for artificial intelligence and led an international audit initiative examining government integration of artificial intelligence in 12 European countries.

A report released by Englman in June 2026 examined Israel’s preparedness in the spheres of government planning, nursing care insurance, the health system, and welfare services for older people. He called for collective responsibility to safeguard the well-being of senior citizens and take advantage of their potential benefit to the community while upholding their dignity, independence and social integration.

== Constructive audit reform ==
In September 2019, soon after taking office, Englman presented an outline for "Constructive Audit Reform" based on "up-to-date models of international audit." Among the fundamental principles of this reform were adopting a statewide perspective; focusing on audit topics with social implications; performing surprise audits; wider use of tools like public questionaries, polls and sampling; employing advanced audit models such as those used in the United States and England; compiling report abstracts that emphasize the "top 5" findings and recommendations; greater used of computerized audit tools and datamining; introducing different types of audits; and enhancing the human resources skill mix.

Englman altered his office's auditing methodology to formally integrate positive feedback and commend high-performing public entities alongside reporting systemic deficiencies. This structural shift called upon auditors to weave constructive praise into draft evaluations and highlight commendable operational execution even in critical reviews.

== Cybersecurity ==
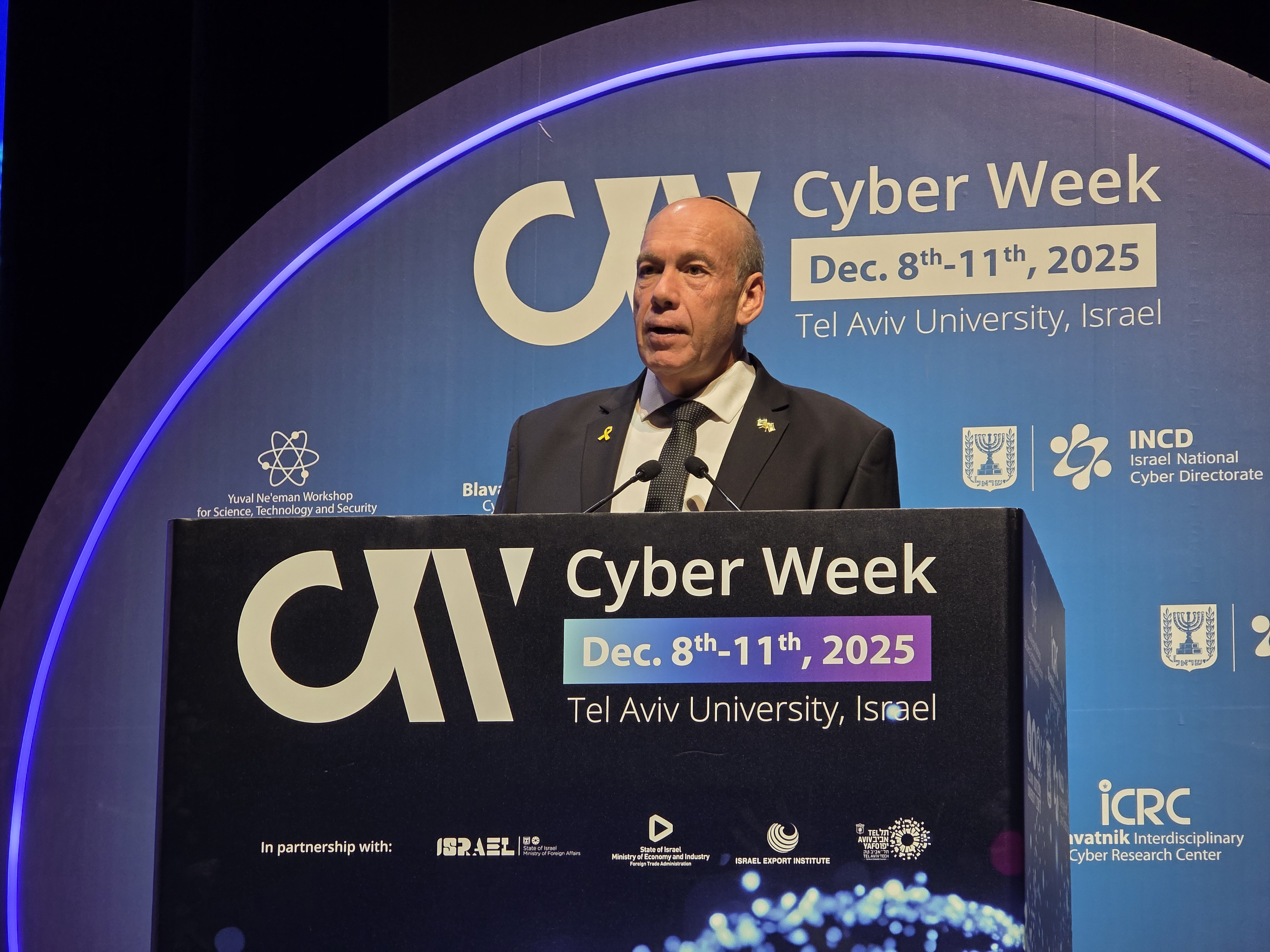
Cyber Week, Tel Aviv University

Speaking at Cyber Week 2023, Englman warned about the dangerous potential of artificial intelligence despite its great benefits. He said his office would be preparing an audit on the subject in cooperation with other EUROSAI members that will focus on technology, regulation and legislation, and implementation of AI in health, law, defense and education.

At a conference at Tel Aviv University in June 2024, Englman revealed that his office was reviewing Israel's cyber defenses and whether adequate steps were being taken to head off attacks and address breaches. He also said he was working with EUROSAI member states on defense against AI-generated cyberthreats.

In a report issued in November 2024, Englman warned that Israel's National Insurance Institute had not updated its cyber security policies in years and did not have enough analysts to address the massive volume of cyberattack alerts received every day.

Speaking at the annual Cyber Week conference at Tel Aviv University on December 9, 2025, Englman warned that Israel was entering an election year and foreign influence posed a real danger to the integrity of the democratic process. Citing the rise in cyber threats from Iran and incidents in which Israelis were recruited as agents, he urged the government to take action.In a report released in 2026, Englman reiterated that hostile actors were exploiting social media to deepen social divisions in Israel, manipulate the public’s perception of reality and undermine trust in the democratic process. In response, the Central Elections Committee said it had established a dedicated task force to address any attempts at election interference.

== International cooperation ==
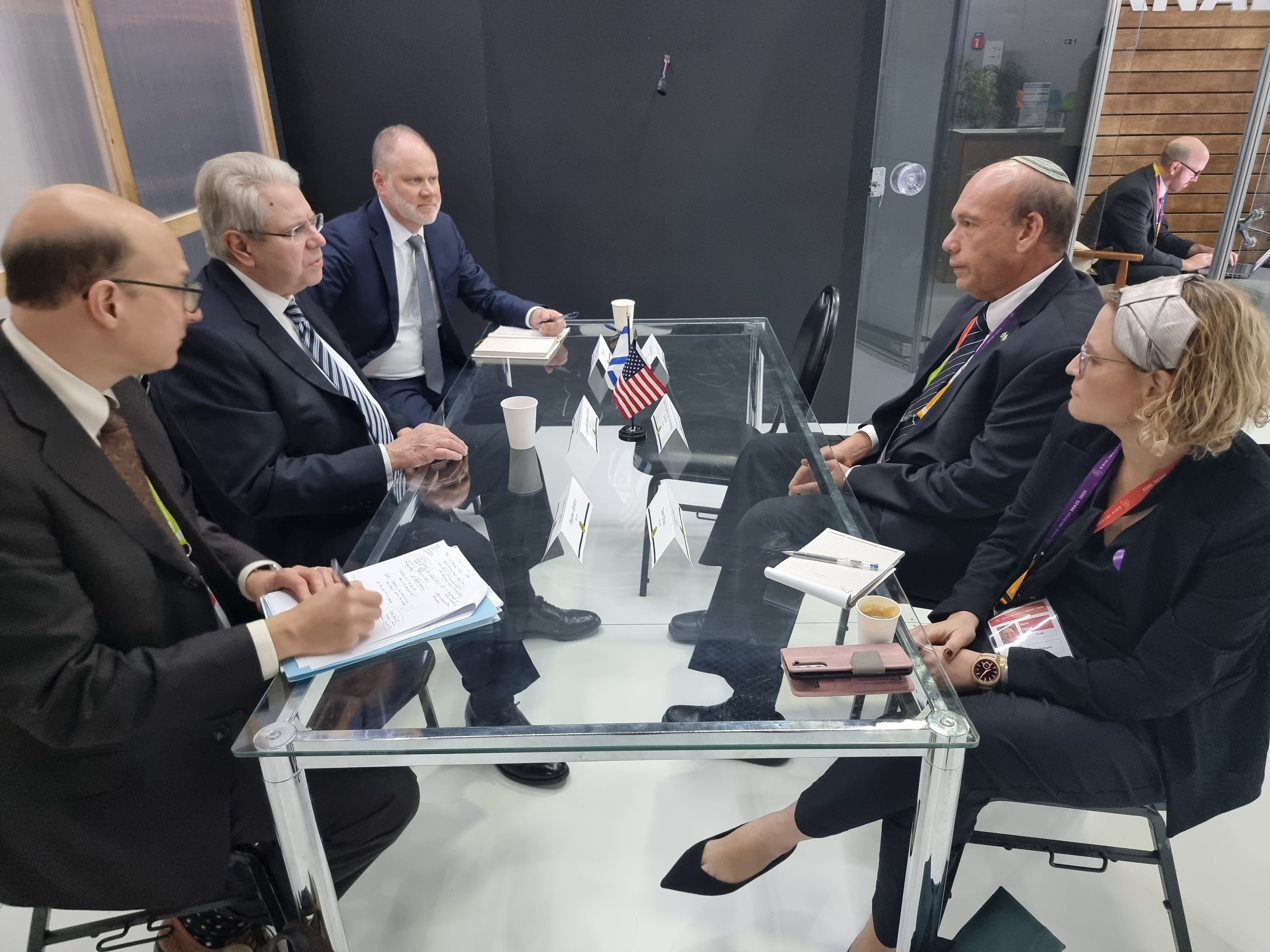
Englman with Gene Dodaro, U.S. comptroller general and head of the Government Accountability Office

In July 2023, Englman paid an official visit to Morocco and met with Zinab El Adaoui, first president of the Moroccan Court of Audit. They held two meetings in which they discussed auditing methodologies and agreed on cooperation between their offices. Englman also signed an agreement with UK Comptroller and Auditor General Gareth Davies for a peer review by American and British representatives who would visit Israel and examine the methodologies he has implemented.

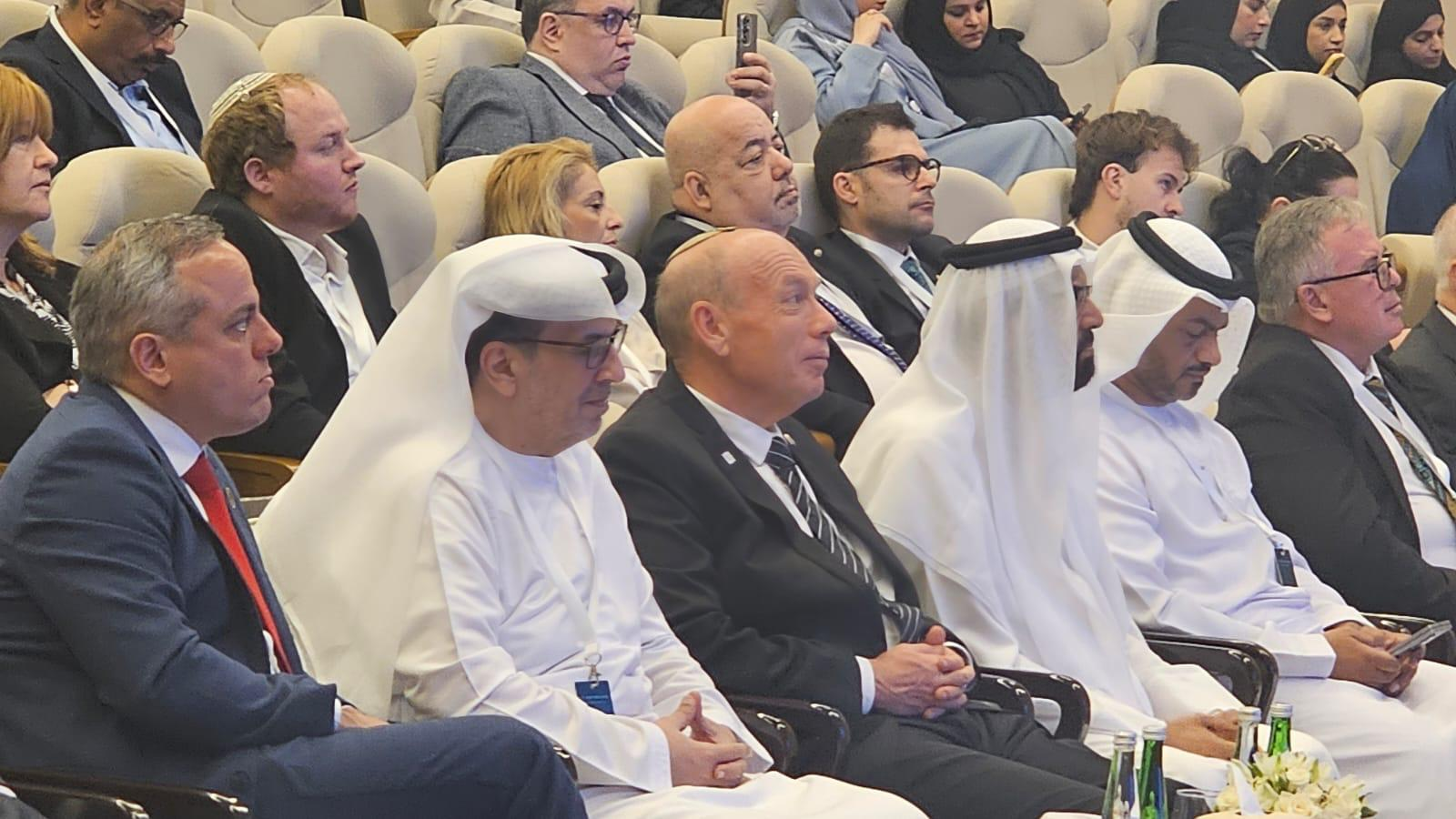
Englman at international AI conference in United Arab Emirates, 2026

At a conference of the Organization of Latin American Caribbean Supreme Audit Institutions (OLACEFS) and EUROSAI in July 2024, attended by 70 countries from Latin America and Europe, Englman spoke about the role of auditors in helping countries ready for climate change. On this occasion, he signed a cooperation and information-sharing agreement with the Mexican state auditor, after signing a similar agreement with Brazil in 2022.

In September 2024, as the guest of honor at an event marking the 160th anniversary of the Romanian Court of Accounts, Englman described the role of state audit institutions as being “the voice for the voiceless.” He met with the Romanian president and prime minister, as well as state comptrollers from around the world, and emphasized the importance of promoting transparency and accountability.

In 2025, Englman signed a landmark MoU with the Supreme Audit Institution of Paraguay headed by Camilo Aldana to promote knowledge-sharing and strengthen public sector auditing frameworks.

In June 2026, Englman and his team visited the Office of the Comptroller and Auditor General of India. The meeting with K Sanjay Murthy ended with the signing of an MoU for enhanced cooperation in public sector auditing and plans for bilateral seminars in India and Israel.
