= UNMAI =

UNMAI (Unit of Monitoring of Aid Implementation) is an INTOSAI initiative in the framework of the aid audit trail following the December 26, 2004 tsunami which hit Southeast Asia. Its objective is to formulate guidelines and best practices for SAIs and relevant stakeholders in order to have a potential audit trail before disasters occur. UNMAI is a new organisation, based on civil society support and is focused on the performance audit. UNMAI monitors the implementation of aid "in the field".

INTOSAI in this initiative plays an intermediate role between relevant audit institutions - SAIs and UNMAI – in order to "check and balance". It's accountability framework is as follows:

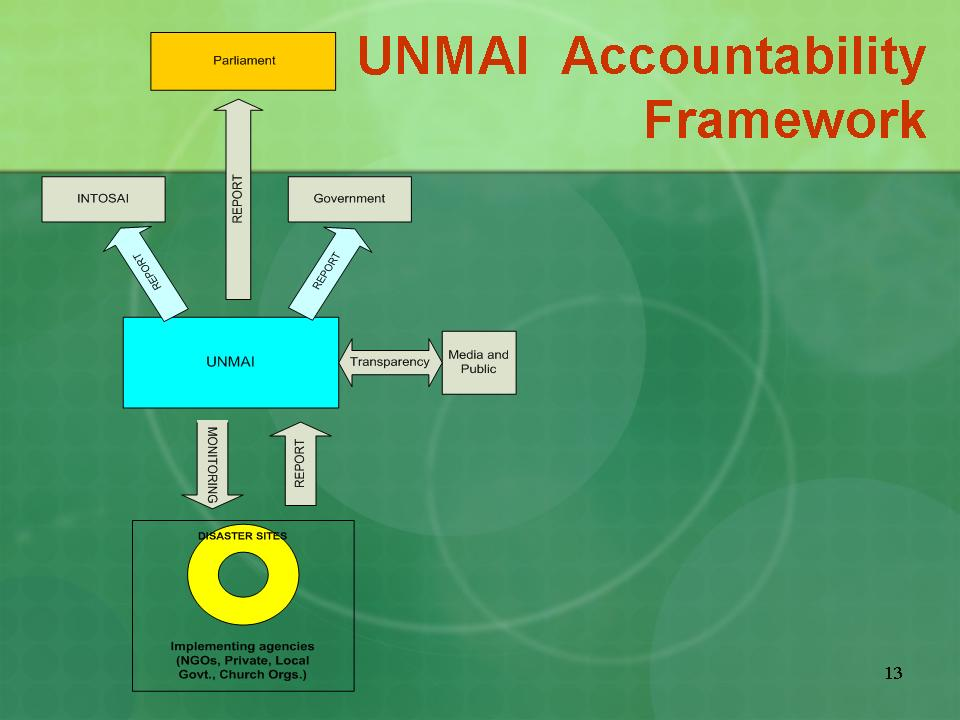
UNMAI Accountability Framework, Courtesy Wawan Sobari

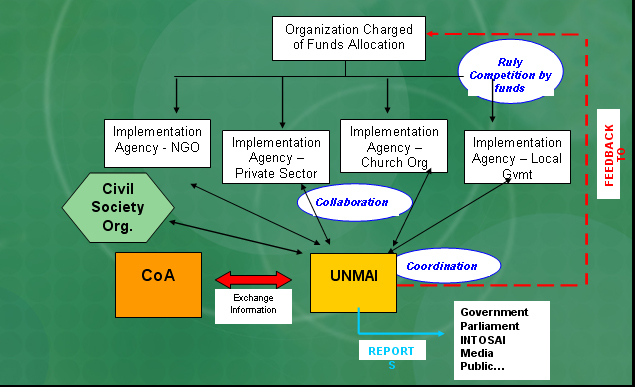
Guiding Principles UNMAI, Courtesy Wawan Sobari
