= Sint-Hubertuscollege =

School in Neerpelt, Belgium

The Sint-Hubertuscollege, located in Neerpelt, Belgium is secondary education.

The school, founded in 1910, was the first Flemish college, being the first secondary school of Belgium where the primary language of education was Dutch. The common language for secondary schools in Belgium up until this time was French. The school is strongly inspired by Christian traditions and bases its educational project on these foundations. The school's Board of Governors, VZW Katholiek Secundair Onderwijs Sint-Willibrord, is the actual organising directive of the school.

The institution offers various programs of the General Secondary Education system, which is the system preparing for further higher university education: Economics-Modern Languages, Economics-Mathematics, Greek-Latin, Latin-Modern Languages, Latin-Natural Sciences, Latin-Mathematics, Modern Languages-Natural Sciences, Modern Languages-Mathematics, Natural Sciences-Mathematics.

The school has a distinctive view on its functioning in the educational process, with an important role for extracurricular activities. Various events are organized, including visits to exhibitions, museums, theater, and film, and various activities such as sports, charity, and cultural exchanges. The Sint-Hubertuscollege additionally offers winter sports vacation for its third year students and extensive cultural Italy and Greece vacations for its sixth year students.

Every year, the school is the center of the internationally recognized European Musicfestival for Youngsters, established in cooperation with the Davidsfonds. The school's cultural dance group was Cultural Ambassador of Flanders (1995) and over time has performed in over 40 countries including Israel, South Africa, United Arab Emirates, Sweden, Argentina, Canada, and the United States.

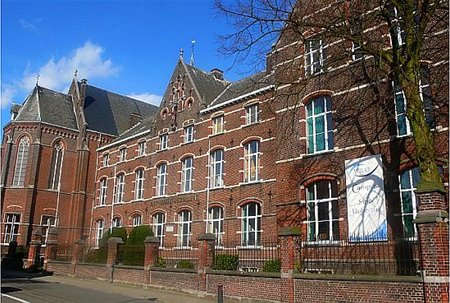
The protected front side of the Sint-Hubertuscollege with its adjacent monumental chapel

In January 2008, the government of Flanders decided to officially protect the college and its buildings by listing it as cultural heritage, citing the historical importance of the college. The Sint-Hubertuscollege has a private chapel in Neo-Gothic style with monumental stained glass windows which were financed by its alumni foundation.

Famous associated persons include:

- Baron Stijn Coninx, director of Academy Award nominated film "Daens"
- Jaak Gabriëls, Belgian Minister of State
- Wim Mertens, composer, musician, and musicologist
- Stijn Meuris, singer-songwriter with the bands Monza and Noordkaap
- Karel Pinxten, member of the Court of Auditors
- Raf Simons, fashion designer
- Joost Zweegers, singer-songwriter with the band Novastar
