= Roger Hussey =

Roger Hussey may refer to:

- Roger Hussey, see International Organization of Supreme Audit Institutions
- Roger Hussey (MP), for Sussex (UK Parliament constituency)
