= Supreme audit institution =

Independent governmental audit agencies

A supreme audit institution (SAI) is an independent national-level institution which conducts audits of government activities. Most supreme audit institutions are established in their country's constitution, and their mandate is further refined in national legislation. Supreme audit institutions play an important role in providing oversight and accountability in a country by monitoring the use of public funds and reviewing the quality and accuracy of government financial reporting. They also contribute to anti-corruption efforts. Depending on the country, a supreme audit institution may be called a court of audit (common in Europe and its former colonies), auditor-general (common in the Anglosphere) or the board of audit (in some Asian countries). Nearly every supreme audit institution in the world is a member of the International Organization of Supreme Audit Institutions, which works to establish and disseminate international standards and good practices.

In some countries, such as with Taiwan's Control Yuan, the audit institution may constitute a separate, independent branch of government in addition to the more typical executive, legislative and judicial branches.

== List of supreme audit institutions ==
- Afghanistan: Supreme Audit Office (Merged with the Directorate of Supervision and Prosecution of Decrees and Orders in 2024)
- Albania: State Supreme Audit
- Algeria: Cour des Comptes
- Andorra: Tribunal de Comptes
- Angola: Tribunal de Contas de Angola
- Antigua and Barbuda: Supreme Audit Institution
- Argentina: Auditoría General de la Nación
- Armenia: Chamber of Audit
- Australia: Australian National Audit Office
- Austria: Rechnungshof
- Azerbaijan: Chamber of Accounts
- Bahamas: Office of the Auditor General
- Bahrain: National Audit Office
- Bangladesh: Comptroller and Auditor General
- Barbados: Auditor General's Office
- Belarus: State Control Committee
- Belgium: Court of Audit of Belgium
- Belize: The Office of the Auditor General
- Benin: Chambre des Comptes de la Cour Suprême
- Bhutan: Royal Audit Authority
- Bolivia: Contraloría General del Estado
- Botswana: Office of the Auditor General
- Brazil: Tribunal de Contas da União
- Bulgaria: Chamber of Audit
- Cape Verde: Tribunal de Contas
- Cambodia: National Audit Authority of Cambodia
- Canada: Auditor General of Canada
- Central African Republic: Inspection Général d’État
- Chile: Comptroller General of Chile
- China: National Audit Office
  - Hong Kong：Audit Commission
  - Macau：Commission of Audit
- Colombia: Contraloria General de la República
- Comoros: Cour Suprême – Section des Comptes des Comores
- Costa Rica: Contraloria General de la República
- Ivory Coast: Cour des Comptes de Côte d'Ivoire
- Croatia: Državni ured za reviziju (State Audit Office)
- Cuba: Contraloría General de la República de Cuba
- Cyprus: Audit Office of the Republic
- Czech Republic: Supreme Audit Office
- Democratic Republic of the Congo: Cour des Comptes
- Denmark: Rigsrevisionen
- Djibouti: Cour des Comptes
- Dominica: Audit Department
- Dominican Republic: Cámara de Cuentas de la República Dominicana
- Egypt: Central Auditing Organization
- Eritrea: Office of the Auditor General
- Estonia: National Audit Office of Estonia
- Europe: European Court of Auditors
- Fiji: Office of the Auditor General
- Finland: National Audit Office of Finland
- France: Court of Audit
- Gabon: Cour des Comptes
- Gambia: National Audit Office
- Ghana: Ghana Audit Service
- Germany: Bundesrechnungshof
- Georgia: State Audit Office of Georgia
- Greece: Court of Audit
- Grenada: Audit Department
- Guatemala: Contraloría General de Cuentas
- Guinea: Cour des Comptes
- Guinea-Bissau: Tribunal de Contas
- Guyana: The Audit Office of Guyana
- Haiti: Cour Supérieure CCA
- Honduras: Tribunal Superior de Cuentas
- Hungary: Állami Számvevőszék
- Iceland: Ríkisendurskoðun
- India: Comptroller and Auditor General of India
- Indonesia: Audit Board of Indonesia
- Iran: Supreme Audit Court
- Iraq: Federal Board of Supreme Audit
- Ireland: Comptroller and Auditor General
- Israel: State Comptroller of Israel
- Italy: Court of Audit
- Jamaica: Audit Department
- Japan: Board of Audit
- Jordan: Audit Bureau of Jordan
- Kazakhstan: Accounts Committee
- Kenya: Kenya National Audit Office
- Kiribati: Kiribati National Audit Office
- Republic of Korea: Board of Audit and Inspection
- Kosovo: National Audit Office of Kosovo
- Kuwait: State Audit Bureau
- Kyrgyzstan: The Accounts Chamber of the Kyrgyz Republic
- Laos: State Audit Organization
- Latvia: State Audit Office of the Republic of Latvia
- Lebanon: Cour des Comptes
- Lesotho: Office of the Auditor General
- Liberia: General Auditing Commission
- Libya: Libyan Audit Bureau
- Liechtenstein: Finanzkontrolle des Fürstentums Liechtenstein
- Lithuania: National Audit Office of Lithuania
- Luxembourg: Cour des Comptes
- Madagascar: Cour des Comptes
- Malawi: National Audit Office
- Malaysia: National Audit Department
- Maldives: Auditor General's Office
- Mali: Contrôle Général des Services Publics
- Malta: National Audit Office
- Marshall Islands: Office of the Auditor General
- Mauritania: Cour des Comptes de la République Islamique de Mauritanie
- Mauritius: National Audit Office
- Mexico: Auditoría Superior de la Federación
- Federated States of Micronesia: Office of the Public Auditor
- Moldova: Curtea de Conturi
- Monaco: Commission Supérieure des Comptes
- Mongolia: Mongolian National Audit Office
- Montenegro: State Audit Institution of Montenegro
- Morocco: Court of Accounts
- Mozambique: Tribunal Administrativo
- Namibia: Office of the Auditor-General
- Nauru: Department of Audit
- Myanmar: Office of the Auditor General
- Nepal: Office of the Auditor General
- Netherlands: Court of Audit
- New Zealand: Office of the Auditor-General
- Nicaragua: Consejo Superior de la Contraloría General
- Niger: Cour des comptes
- Nigeria: Office of the Auditor General for the Federation
- North Macedonia: Drzaven zavod za revizija
- Norway: Office of the Auditor General of Norway
- Oman: State Audit Institution
- Pakistan: Auditor General of Pakistan
- Palau: Office of the Public Auditor
- Palestine: State Audit and Administrative Control Bureau
- Panama: Contraloría General de la República de Panamá
- Papua New Guinea: Auditor General's Office
- Paraguay: Contraloría General de la República
- Peru: Contraloria General de la República
- Philippines: Commission on Audit of the Philippines
- Poland: Supreme Audit Office
- Portugal: Court of Auditors
- Qatar: State Audit Bureau
- Republic of the Congo: Cour des Comptes et de Discipline Budgétaire
- Romania: Court of Audit
- Russia: Accounts Chamber of Russia
- Rwanda: Office of the Auditor General
- Saint Kitts and Nevis: The Audit Office
- Saint Lucia: Office of the Director of Audit
- Samoa: Samoa Audit Office
- São Tomé and Príncipe: Tribunal de Contas
- Saudi Arabia: General Court of Audit
- Senegal: Cour des Comptes
- Serbia: State Audit Institution (Državna revizorska institucija)
- Seychelles: The Audit Department
- Sierra Leone: Audit Service Sierra Leone
- Singapore: Auditor General's Office
- Slovakia: Najvyšši kontrolný úrad Slovenskej republiky
- Slovenia: Court of Audit of Slovenia
- Solomon Islands: Office of the Auditor General
- Somalia: Office of the Auditor General
- South Africa: Auditor-General (South Africa)
- South Sudan: National Audit Chamber
- Spain: Court of Auditors
- Sri Lanka: National Audit Office
- Saint Vincent and the Grenadines: Audit Office
- Sudan: National Audit Chamber
- Suriname: Rekenkamer van Suriname
- Sweden: Swedish National Audit Office
- Switzerland: Eidgenössische Finanzkontrolle
- Syria: The Central Organization of Financial Control
- Taiwan: National Audit Office
- Tajikistan: Accounts Chamber of the Republic of Tajikistan
- Tanzania: National Audit Office
- Thailand: State Audit Office of the Kingdom of Thailand
- Timor-Leste: Tribunal de Recurso
- Togo: La Cour des Comptes
- Tonga: Audit Department
- Trinidad and Tobago: Auditor General's Department
- Tunisia: Cour des Comptes
- Turkey: Court of Accounts
- Turkmenistan: Supreme Control Chamber of Turkmenistan
- Tuvalu: Office of the Auditor General
- Uganda: Office of the Auditor General
- Ukraine: Accounting Chamber
- United Arab Emirates: State Audit Institution
- United Kingdom: National Audit Office
- United States: Government Accountability Office
- Uruguay: Tribunal de Cuentas de la República
- Uzbekistan: Chamber of Auditors of Uzbekistan
- Vanuatu: Office of the Auditor General
- Holy See: Officium Recognitoris Generalis
- Venezuela: Contraloría General de la República
- Vietnam: State Audit Office of Vietnam
- Yemen: Central Organization for Control and Auditing
- Zambia: Office of the Auditor General
- Zimbabwe: Office of the Auditor General

== See also ==
- European Organization of Supreme Audit Institutions
- Government performance auditing
- INTOSAI Development Initiative
- Organization of Latin American and Caribbean Supreme Audit Institutions
- Separation of powers
