= International Journal of Government Auditing =

- Type: Quarterly periodical
- Format: Magazine
- Owner: International Organization of Supreme Audit Institutions
- Publisher: International Organization of Supreme Audit Institutions
- Founded: 1971
- Language: Arabic, English, French, German, and Spanish
- Headquarters: Washington, D.C.
- ISSN: 0047-0724
- Website: http://www.intosaijournal.org/

The International Journal of Government Auditing is published quarterly in Arabic, English, French, German and Spanish. As the official publication of the International Organization of Supreme Audit Institutions (INTOSAI), the Journal supports cooperation, collaboration and knowledge sharing among Supreme Audit Institutions (SAI) and the broader accountability community.

The heads of the Supreme Audit Institutions of Austria, Canada, Tunisia, United States of America and Venezuela are the Journal's Board of Editors, and the U.S. Government Accountability Office publishes the Journal on behalf of INTOSAI through the auspices of the International Journal of Government Auditing, Inc.
