= Organization of Latin American and Caribbean Supreme Audit Institutions =

Regional organization of supreme audit institutions

The Organization of Latin American and Caribbean Supreme Audit Institutions (OLACEFS) is an international, autonomous, independent, apolitical and permanent organization. Its origins can be traced back to the First Congress of Latin American Supreme Audit Institutions - CLADEFS - held in 1963 in Caracas, Venezuela, in response to the need for a forum for exchanging ideas and experiences relating to government control, and for promoting cooperation and development between supreme audit institutions. At the Congress it was recommended that a Latin American Institute of Fiscal Control be created to carry out specialized research and serve as a center for information, education, coordination and mutual assistance between audit institutions.

Currently OLACEFS is one of INTOSAI’s seven regional working groups.

== Origins: Latin American Institute for Auditing Sciences – ILACIF ==
At the First Latin American Congress of Supreme Audit Institutions in 1963, it was concluded that it would be of mutual advantage for Latin American countries to exchange experiences concerning financial management and oversight, and that by adopting the principles and objectives of regional integration and unity within the scope of their specific activities, governmental management would be improved and in turn communities better served. Convinced of the importance for Latin America - and especially for its respective auditing agencies - of having a Latin American audit institute, participants of the Congress appointed the Chilean delegation to undertake the necessary steps to make this a reality as soon as possible.

It was at the Second Latin American Congress of Supreme Audit Institutions, held on April 9, 1965 in Santiago de Chile, that the Office of the Comptroller General of Chile submitted a draft charter along with a study carried out by the Office of the Comptroller General of the Republic of Venezuela. Those Supreme Audit Institutions attending the congress agreed on the creation of the Latin American Institute of Auditing Sciences – ILACIF – and approved its charter. The objective behind the creation of the Institute was to promote specialized scientific research, gather information and provide advice and coordination amongst the continent's regulatory agencies so they could better serve their citizens in the exercise of the powers granted to them by the respective legal systems. The following were signatories to the creation of ILACIF: Argentina, Brazil, Colombia, Chile, Ecuador, El Salvador, Mexico, Nicaragua, Panama, Puerto Rico, Dominican Republic, Uruguay and Venezuela. Later, the following countries would join: Peru, Bolivia, Costa Rica, Guatemala, Honduras, Netherlands Antilles, Paraguay and Suriname. The Congress also saw the Office of the Comptroller General of Venezuela designated headquarters of the Institute.

== New Institution: Organization of Latin American and Caribbean Supreme Audit Institutions – OLACEFS ==
Changes to internal rules and organizational structure were recommended by a reforming committee, and at the special session of October 11, 1990, ILACIF's Extraordinary General Assembly, held in Buenos Aires, Argentina, approved the proposed amendments as well as changing the name of the institute to the Organization of Latin American and Caribbean Supreme Audit Institutions (OLACEFS). The term Organization was considered more appropriate for an entity that brought together the highest officials in the field of control and monitoring in Latin America and the Caribbean.

OLACEFS currently undertakes specialized scientific research and carries out activities relating to research, training, specialization, advising and technical assistance. It coordinates and provides the Supreme Audit Institutions, or SAIs, of Latin America and the Caribbean with information, the aim of all the above being to promote their development and improvement.

=== Principles ===
In line with the provisions of its Charter, the Organization of Latin American and Caribbean

Supreme Audit Institutions is based on the following principles:

I. Legal equality of the Organization's member entities, in accordance with their category;

II. Observance of the legal systems of each nation and the principles of international law, being mindful of the independence and sovereignty of each country to make their own decisions concerning systems of control and supervision for the management of public resources;

III. Voluntary joining and leaving of members;

IV. Adherence to a democratic system of adopting resolutions by majority agreement and respect for the concept of minorities;

V. Decentralization of activities;

VI. Close and ongoing cooperation between the Organization and its members;

VII. Spirit of public service and disallowing political interference of any kind;

VIII. Transparency;

IX. Rotation of all full members through OLACEFS administrative bodies.

=== Functions ===
The OLACEFS Charter of the Organization lists the following functions:

• To promote and conduct systematic research on the control and supervision of the management of public resources and disseminate results amongst members;

• To organize and conduct specialization, postgraduate and training courses, as well as seminars and special events principally for staff members to carry out technical tasks relating to control and oversight;

• To provide advisory services and technical assistance on the control and oversight of the management of public resources;

• To compile work done in each country concerning administrative and financial organization and control, to be disseminated amongst Latin American and Caribbean nations;

• To promote and publish written material on the control and oversight of the management of public resources;

• To serve as liaison between the supreme audit institutions of other nations, answering queries and promoting the exchange of specialists;

• To establish and foster a resource center principally for literature concerning the control and oversight of the management of public resources and related disciplines;

• To maintain contact on scientific and technical matters with institutions and organizations in other parts of the world specializing in the control and oversight of the management of public resources;

• To create commissions and committees for subregions, functional areas, issues and/or specific matters, as appropriate;

• To establish relationships with and obtain the assistance of experts on the control and oversight of the management of public resources, universities, bodies that fund development and associations for professionals;

• To coordinate special studies requested by a government or group of governments of Latin American and Caribbean nations;

• To organize high-level think-tanks made up of active members to analyse specific strategic issues related to supreme control and oversight;

• To award prizes and/or offer stimulus as per the conditions laid down by the specific regulation.

=== Funding ===
Funding for the operation of the organization comes from annual fees paid by individual members, contributions from other international institutions and organizations such as GIZ, the IDB, the World Bank and the INTOSAI Development Initiative, revenue from services provided by OLACEFS, and loans and donations.

=== Structure ===
==== General Assembly ====
The General Assembly is the Organization's highest body and is made up of all OLACEFS members. Its meetings are convened and chaired by the Presidency, with the collaboration of the Executive Secretariat.

The General Assembly makes decisions on the organization's strategic direction andorientation.

==== Board of directors ====
The Board of Directors is a collegiate body made up of five full members. It is headed by the Presidency. The Executive Secretariat meanwhile serves as secretariat of the Board and has a right of say.

The Board is made up of:

Country	SAI	Position	Period
Peru	Office of the Comptroller General of the Republic of Peru	Chairman	2019–2021
Chile	Office of the Comptroller General of the Republic of Chile	Executive Secretariat	2013–2021
Uruguay	Court of Accounts of the Oriental Republic of Uruguay	Elected Member	2019–2021
Brazil	Court of Audit of the Union of Brazil	Elected Member	2017–2019
Paraguay	Comptroller General's Office of the Republic of Paraguay	EFSUR Presidency	Regulatory period EFSUR
Guatemala	Comptroller General's Osffice of Accounts of Guatemala	OCCEFS Presidency	Regulatory period OCCEFS
Colombia	Comptroller General's Office of the Republic of Colombia	As host of XXX Assembly	2020

==== Presidency ====
In accordance with the provisions of the Charter, the Presidency of OLACEFS is held by the full member elected by the General Assembly for a period of three years without re-election, and represented the head of the chosen SAI. The functions and powers of this body are defined in the OLACEFS Regulations.

As from January 1, 2019 until December 31, 2021, the Presidency will be held by the Office of the Comptroller General of the Republic of Peru. As such the Chairman of the Organization is Mr. Nelson Eduardo Shack Yalta, Comptroller General of the Republic of Peru.

Timeline of the Presidency

Year	Country	SAI
1991–1996	Mexico	Superior Audit Office of the Federation of Mexico
1997–2002	Peru	Office of the Comptroller General of the Republic of Peru
2003–2004	Venezuela	Office of the Comptroller General of the Republic of Venezuela
2005–2006	Chile	Office of the Comptroller General of the Republic of Chile
2007–2008	El Salvador	Court of Audit of the Republic of El Salvador
2009–2010	Colombia	Office of the Comptroller General of the Republic of Colombia
2011–2012	Ecuador	Office of the Comptroller General of the Republic of Ecuador
2013–2015	Brazil	Court of Auditors of Brazil
2016–2018	Mexico	Superior Audit Office of the Federation of Mexico
2019–2021	Peru	Office of the Comptroller General of the Republic of Peru

==== Executive Secretariat and Headquarters ====
In accordance with the Organization's regulations, the Executive Secretariat is held by a full member elected by the General Assembly. It is headed by an Executive Secretary who is the comptroller of the full member SAI. The term for the Executive Secretariat is six years, renewable for an additional three years.

This body is responsible for providing support for the various OLACEFS organs (Assembly, Board, Presidency, Committees, Committees and Working Groups), as well as technical and administrative support for the implementation of their activities.

From January 1, 2013 until December 31, 2018 the Presidency will be held by the Office of the Comptroller General of the Republic of Chile. The current Comptroller General of Chile and OLACEFS Executive Secretary is Jorge Bermúdez Soto.

The XXVIII OLACEFS General Assembly, held in Buenos Aires, Argentina, in October 2018, has unanimously approved the extension of the mandate of the Executive Secretariat, period 2019 - 2021, in accordance with article 16 of the organisational Charter.

Timeline of the Executive Secretariat

Year	Country	SAI Executive Secretariat and Headquarters
1990–1996	Mexico	Superior Audit Office of the Federation of Mexico
1997–2002	Peru	Office of the Comptroller General of the Republic of Peru
2003–2012	Panama	Office of the Comptroller General of the Republic of Panama
2013–2021	Chile	Office of the Comptroller General of the Republic of Chile

==== Committees ====
The committees are administrative bodies that assist in the Organization's management.

• Capacity Building Committee (CCC): This is an administrative body of a permanent nature whose mission is to promote and manage the development of SAIs’ professional and institutional capacities in order to increase the effectiveness of management and modernization of public administration.

• Legal Advisory Committee (CAJ): This is a permanent administrative body, advisor to the Organization on legal and regulatory matters. It is responsible for reviewing the OLACEFS Charter and Regulations, making proposals to the Board and the General Assembly on alterations, modifications and new regulations for the modernization and better functioning of the Organization.

==== Commissions ====
The commissions are technical bodies dedicated to the study and development of specific topics and issues relevant to OLACEFS’ objectives and activities. Currently the organization has the following commissions: • Technical Commission on Good Governance Practices (CTPBG): This is a permanent technical body charged with promoting the efficiency, accountability, efficacy and transparency of public administration by strengthening SAIs.

• Technical Committee on the Environment (COMTEMA): This is a permanent technical body, responsible for contributing to the development of environmental audits by OLACEFS member SAIs, promoting the control of environmental management and ensuring the strengthening and integration of the Organization's SAIs.

• Commission for the Assessment of Performance and Performance Indicators (CEDEIR): This is a technical body of a permanent nature, designed to manage knowledge for the benefit of the Organization and member SAIs on issues relating to performance evaluation, strategic management and control.

• Commission on Information and Communication Technologies (CTIC): This is a technical body of a permanent nature set up to provide advice to the Organization on issues relating to Information and Communication Technology (ICT).

• Citizen Participation Commission (CPC): This is a technical body of a permanent nature dedicated to promoting citizen participation, social control and social capital through oversight.

==== Working Groups ====
The working groups are technical bodies given the task of studying or developing specific issues for a specified amount of time. Below are OLACEFS’ current working groups: • Working Group for Public Works Audit (GTOP): The main objective is to help SAIs in the region to identify and share good practices in public works audit as a strategy for joint learning and institutional capacity building.

Working Groups that have ceased to operate

• Working Group for the Implementation of International Audit Standards in OLACEFS SAIs (GTANIA): This ceased to exist as of January 1, 2016 in accordance with Resolution 40/2015/AG of the OLACEFS XXV Ordinary General Assembly of OLACEFS, held in Querétaro, Mexico in November 2015.

• Working Group for Manuals, Guides and Observations on the OLACEFS Charter and Regulations (GTN): This ceased to exist as of January 1, 2015 in accordance with Resolution 16/2014/AG of the OLACEFS XXIV Ordinary General Assembly, held in Cusco, Peru in November 2015.

== Organization members ==
Organization members are grouped into two categories:

I. Full members - being the Supreme Audit Institutions of the countries of Latin America and the Caribbean; and,

II. Associate members - being sub-national, state or local Audit Institutions; and also Supreme Audit Institutions from other regions and legal entities governed by public international law that provide technical or financial support for the development of the organization.

Currently the following entities are part of OLACEFS:

=== Full members ===
Country	Supreme Audit Institution
Argentina	General Audit Office of Argentina
Belize	General Audit Office of Belize
Bolivia	Office of the Comptroller General of Bolivia
Brazil	Court of Auditors of Brazil
Chile	Office of the Comptroller General of the Republic of Chile
Colombia	Office of the Comptroller General of the Republic of Colombia
Costa Rica	Office of the Comptroller General of the Republic of Costa Rica
Cuba	Office of the Comptroller General of the Republic of Cuba
Curaçao	Comptroller General's Office of Curaçao
Ecuador	Office of the Comptroller General of the Republic of Ecuador
El Salvador	Court of Audit of the Republic of El Salvador
Guatemala	Office of the Comptroller General of the Republic of Guatemala
Honduras	Supreme Court of Auditors of the Republic of Honduras
Mexico	Superior Audit Office of the Federation of Mexico
Nicaragua	Office of the Comptroller General of the Republic of Nicaragua
Panama	Office of the Comptroller General of the Republic of Panama
Paraguay	Office of the Comptroller General of the Republic of Paraguay
Peru	Office of the Comptroller General of the Republic of Peru
Puerto Rico	Office of the Comptroller of the Commonwealth of Puerto Rico
Dominican Republic	Chamber of Accounts of the Dominican Republic
Uruguay	Court of Auditors of the Oriental Republic of Uruguay
Venezuela	Office of the Comptroller General of the Republic of Venezuela

=== Associate Members ===
Country	Audit Institution
Spain	Court of Auditors of Spain
Portugal	Court of Auditors of Portugal
Colombia	Office of the Comptroller General of Bogotá
Colombia	Office of the Comptroller General of Medellin
Dominican Republic	Office of the Comptroller General of the Dominican Republic
Argentina	Honorable Court of Accounts of the Province of Buenos Aires
Argentina	Court of Accounts of the Province of Santa Fe
Brazil	Court of Auditors of the State of Acre
Brazil	Court of Auditors of the State of Amazonas
Brazil	Court of Auditors of the Municipalities of the State of Bahia
Brazil	Court of Auditors of the State of Bahia
Brazil	Court of Auditors of the State of Ceará
Brazil	Court of Auditors of the Federal District
Brazil	Court of Auditors of the State of Espirito Santo
Brazil	Court of Auditors of the State of Mato Grosso
Brazil	Court of Auditors of the State of Minas Gerais
Brazil	Court of Auditors of the State of Pará
Brazil	Court of Auditors of the State of Paraná
Brazil	Court of Auditors of Pernambuco
Brazil	Court of Auditors of the Municipality of Rio de Janeiro
Brazil	Court of Auditors of the State of Rondonia
Brazil	Court of Auditors of Rio Grande do Norte
Brazil	Court of Auditors of the State of Rio Grande do Sul
Brazil	Court of Auditors of the State of Santa Catarina
Brazil	Court of Auditors of the State of Tocantins
Brazil	ATRICON - Association of Members of the Courts of Accounts of Brazil
Brazil	IRB - Instituto Rui Barbosa Brazil
