= Supreme Audit Institution of Antigua and Barbuda =

Agency overview
- Formed: 31 March 2014
- Annual budget: XCD$1,080,263 (2021)
- Agency executive: Director of Audit, Dean Evanson
- Website: audit.gov.ag

The Supreme Audit Institution of Antigua and Barbuda, co-officially known as the Office of the Director of Audit, is the supreme audit institution of Antigua and Barbuda, and as such, assists the Parliament in holding the government accountable in management of the country's finances and operations. The institution describes itself as "an independent, constitutionally established office that exists to serve Parliament."

Section 97 of the constitution creates the position of Director of Audit. The Director of Audit shall ensure that all funds appropriated by Parliament and disbursed have been used for the purposes for which they were appropriated and that the expenditure complies with the authority governing it. Additionally, the Director of Audit shall at least once annually audit and report on the public accounts of Antigua and Barbuda, the accounts of all officers and authorities of the Government, and the accounts of all courts of law in Antigua and Barbuda (including the courts of appeal). All businesses owned, managed, or acting on behalf of Antigua and Barbuda must have their balance sheets, other financial statements, and accounts audited by the Director of Audit. All books, records, returns, reports, and other documents that, in his view, relate to any of the accounts mentioned in subsections (2) and (3) of section 97 must be made available to the Director of Audit and any other officer authorized by him.

Every report that the Director of Audit submits to the Minister who is currently in charge of finances pursuant to this section must be laid before the House no later than seven days following the House's next meeting. The Director of Audit shall transmit copies of the report to the Speaker, who shall as soon as practically possible present them to the House, if the Minister fails to lay a report before the House in accordance with subsection (5) of section 97 of the constitution. The Director of Audit shall perform such other duties with respect to the Government's accounts, the accounts of any other authorities or bodies created by law for public purposes, or the accounts of any enterprises owned or controlled by or on behalf of Antigua and Barbuda, as may be provided by or under any law passed by Parliament. The Director of Audit is not subject to the direction or control of any other person or authority when performing the duties outlined in Section 97's subsections (2), (3), (4), (5), and (6).

The responsibilities of the Supreme Audit Institution are outlined in the Office of the Director of Audit Act, 2014.

== Appointment of the director of audit ==
The Prime Minister must approve the appointment of the Director of Audit, who will be chosen by the Governor-General acting on the recommendation of the Public Service Commission. This approval must come after consultation with the Prime Minister by the Commission. The Governor-General, acting in accordance with the advice of the Public Service Commission offered after the Commission has consulted the Prime Minister and has obtained the Prime Minister's approval to the appointment, may name a person to act as Director of Audit if the position is vacant or if the incumbent is unable to perform the duties of his office for any reason. The provisions of Section 87 of the Constitution's subsections (5) to (11) (which deal with the appointment and removal of the Director of Public Prosecutions) shall apply to the Director of Audit in the same manner as they do to the Director of Public Prosecutions; provided, however, that references to the Judicial and Legal Services Commission in subsections (9) and (10) shall be interpreted to mean the Public Service Commission.
