= Court of Auditors =

Court of Auditors may refer to:

- European Court of Auditors
- Court of Auditors (Spain)
- Court of Auditors (France)
- Court of Auditors (Portugal)
- Court of Audit (Netherlands)
- Court of Audit (Italy)
- Cour des Comptes (France)
- Chambre des Comptes (Navarre)
- Commission Supérieure des Comptes
- Bundesrechnungshof
