= European Organization of Supreme Audit Institutions =

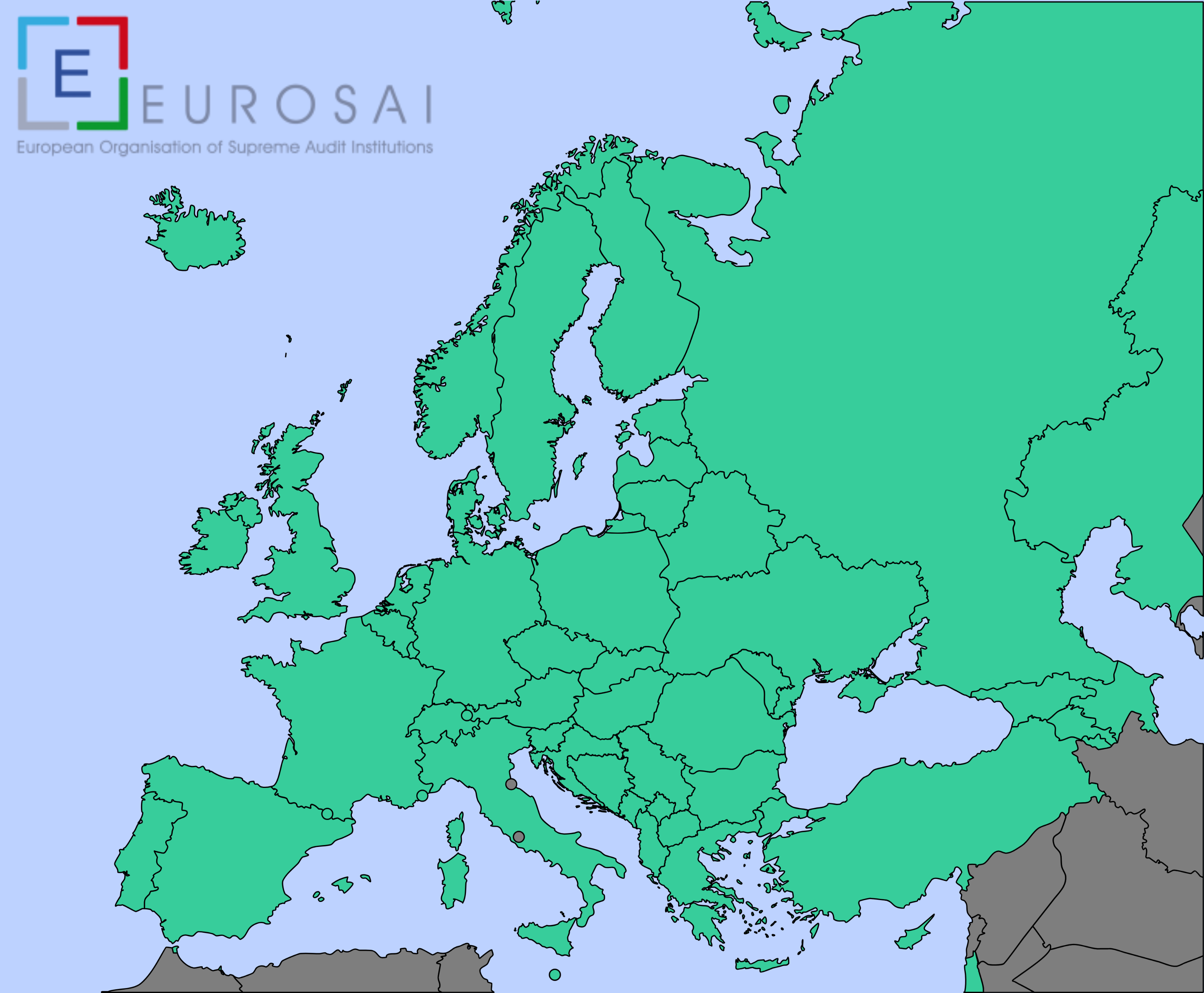
- Abbreviation: EUROSAI
- Formation: 1990; 36 years ago
- Type: Intergovernmental organisation
- Purpose: Coordinate audit policy and practices between countries in Europe
- Headquarters: Madrid, Spain
- Region served: Europe
- Members: 50
- President: Matanyahu Englman
- Parent organization: International Organization of Supreme Audit Institutions
- Website: www.eurosai.org

European Organization of Supreme Audit Institutions (EUROSAI) is a European intergovernmental organization whose members are supreme audit institutions in their respective countries. It is one of the seven regional working groups of the International Organization of Supreme Audit Institutions (INTOSAI).

EUROSAI comprises 50 members that include the Supreme Audit Institutions of 49 countries and the European Court of Auditors.

Its parent organisation INTOSAI comprises 191 full members: the Supreme Audit Institutions (SAIs) of 190 countries and the European Court of Auditors (and 4 associate members) and is listed as a support organisation of the United Nations.

== History ==
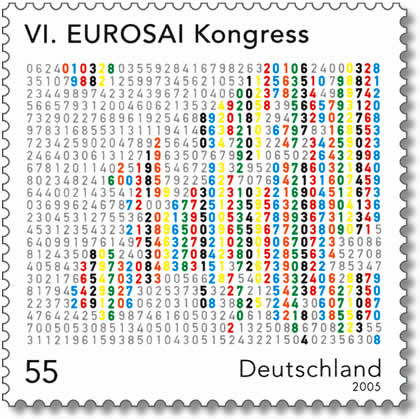
German stamp commemorating EUROSAI congress

EUROSAI was set up in 1990 with 30 members (the SAIs of 29 European States and the European Court of Auditors). Now membership stands at 50 SAIs (the SAIs of 49 European States and the European Court of Auditors).

Although EUROSAI is the junior of INTOSAI’s seven Regional Working Groups, the idea of a European organisation of SAIs dates back to the foundation of INTOSAI in 1953. The first active steps towards the establishment of EUROSAI took place in 1974 during the VIII INTOSAI Congress in Madrid (1974). Between 1975 and 1989 the SAIs of Italy and Spain, counting on the Contact Committee of Heads of SAIs of the European Economic Community countries, paved the way for EUROSAI by preparing the initial drafts of EUROSAI Statutes. In June 1989 the XIII INTOSAI Congress, held in Berlin, adopted the “Berlin Declaration” comprising the agreement of creating the European organisation of SAIs.

In November 1990, the Constitutive Conference and the first Congress of EUROSAI were held in Madrid (Spain). During this event, the first EUROSAI President and Governing Board were elected, the Statutes were debated and approved, and the headquarters and permanent Secretariat were established.

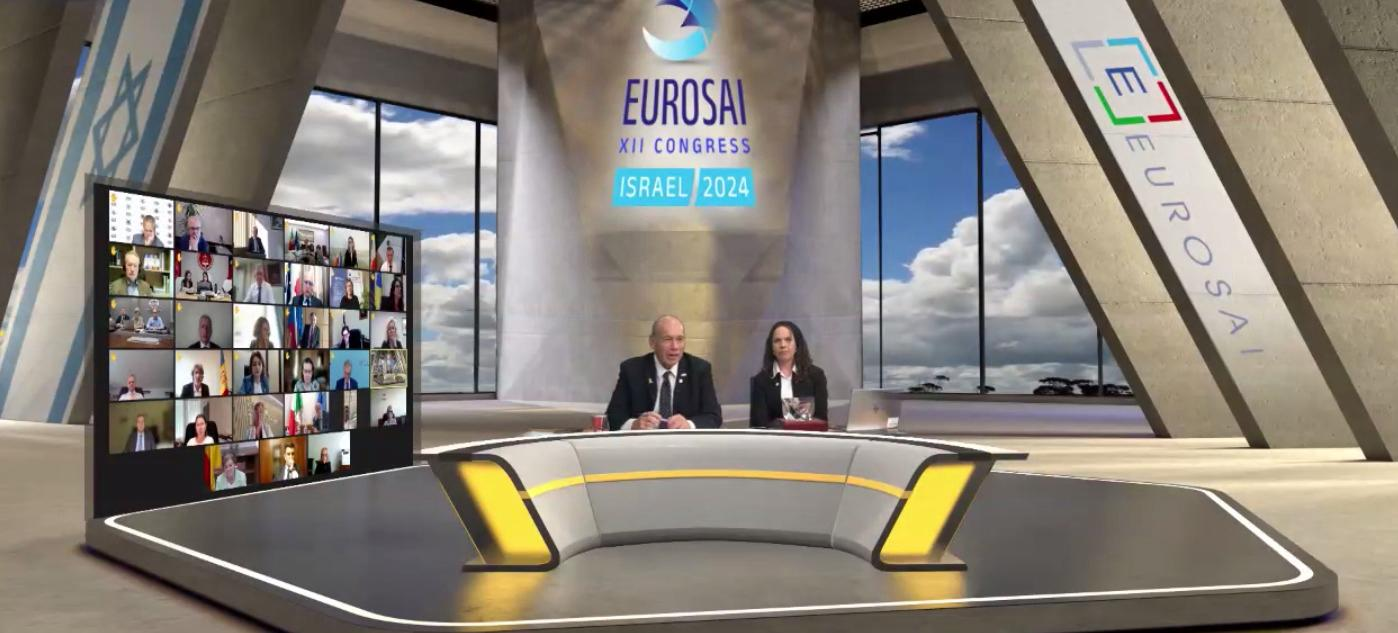
Matanyahu Englman, president of EUROSAI, 2024

Matanyahu Englman, the State Comptroller and Ombudsman of the State of Israel, was vice-president of the organization and became president in 2024.

== Tasks ==
The objectives of the organisation, defined in Article 1 of its Statutes, are to promote professional cooperation among SAI members and other organizations, to encourage the exchange of information and documentation, to advance the study of public sector audit, to stimulate the creation of university professorships in this subject and to work towards the harmonisation of terminology in the field of public sector audit.

EUROSAI undertakes its activity through three bodies, i.e. the Congress, the Governing Board and the Secretariat.

=== Congress ===
According to the organisation’s Statutes, the EUROSAI Congress is the supreme authority of the organisation and consists of all its members. It is convened every three years. Up to now, the following congresses have taken place:

- 1990: Madrid, Spain (Constitutive Conference)
- 1993: Stockholm, Sweden
- 1996: Prague, Czech Republic
- 1999: Paris, France
- 2002: Moscow, Russian Federation
- 2005: Bonn, Germany
- 2008: Kraków, Poland
- 2011: Lisbon, Portugal
- 2014: The Hague, The Netherlands
- 2017: Istanbul, Turkey
- 2021: Czech Republic
- 2024: Israel

=== Governing Board ===
According to the Statutes, the EUROSAI Governing Board is composed of eight members: four full-fledged members (Heads of the SAIs that hosted the last two ordinary sessions of Congress, Head of the SAI to hold the next regular session of Congress, and Secretary General of EUROSAI), and four members elected by the Congress for a period of six years (two members renewable every three years). The Heads of SAIs that are part of the INTOSAI Governing Board and are EUROSAI members also participate in the Governing Board, as observers.

=== Secretariat ===
The Secretariat is held permanently by the SAI of Spain (Court of Auditors, Spanish: Tribunal de Cuentas), which is also the EUROSAI headquarters.
