= Audit Bureau of Jordan =

Government agency of Jordan

Agency overview
- Formed: 1952
- Preceding agency: The Department of Accounts Auditing and Reviewing
- Jurisdiction: Jordanian government
- Headquarters: Amman, Jordan
- Agency executives: Dr. Radhi Al-Hamadeen, President; Ahmed AlSawai, Secretary General
- Website: Official website

Audit Bureau of Jordan is an independent Government agency and a supreme audit institution which is responsible for auditing the ministries, public institutions, public departments, municipalities, co-operatives, labor unions, corporations where Government of Jordan has more than 50% of their shares, and any entity the Council of Ministers may entrust the Bureau to audit its accounts.

== History ==
The Audit Bureau of Jordan was established since 1952, under the Audit Bureau's Law of 1952, which has been issued in accordance with the Jordan Constitution to audit the revenues and expenditures of the state and ways of expenditure.

The public audit function in Jordan has a much longer date and has passed through various stages and amendments that were closely corresponded to the progress of the political, economical, and legislative conditions in Jordan.

=== Accounts Audit Department ===
The auditing function started in January 1928, where an audit branch named the "Accounts Review Department" was established in the Emirate of Transjordan, it had been charged with reviewing the financial accounts of the Emirate. Late 1930, the audit branch had been altered to a department, and was renamed with "Accounts Audit Department" under the ministerial resolution published in the Official Gazette No.271, 9 August 1930.

=== Department of Audit and Verification of Accounts ===
The Department of Audit and Verification of Accounts was established in 1931 when the a Law of Audit and Verification of Accounts was passed under which the department had been attached to the Prime Ministry, in 1939 it was disconnected from the Prime Ministry and connected to the Ministry of Finance. It was connected back and forth between the Prime Ministry and the Ministry of Finance until 1952, the year in which the Law of the Audit Bureau of Jordan passed.

=== Audit Bureau ===
This is the stage in which the Audit Bureau as a constitutional body has been established in 1952, in accordance with the Constitution of Jordan which was issued on 8/2/1952. Article 119 stipulates "Bureau act was set to monitor the State's revenues, expenditures and ways of expenditure". Five amendments to this Law were issued over the last fifty years, to keep pace with the political, economic, and social developments.

== Duties ==
- Present an annual Auditor's report to the House of Representatives which includes; any irregularities, deficiencies, or weaknesses in the performance of the audited entities, together with its recommendations for addressing these irregularities, at the beginning of the ordinary session of the Parliament, and at any time the House of Representatives may requires the Audit Bureau to provide it with any audit report.
- Audit the government revenues and expenditures, deposits, advances, loans, settlements, and warehouses accounts.
- Provide advice in the areas of audit and accounting for the entities subject to the audit of the Audit Bureau.
- Audit public money to ensure that spending has been carried out in a sound, legal, and effective manner.
- Ensure compliance of the public entities with the applied environmental legislations.
- Ensure that the administrative decisions and procedures made by the public entities are being made in accordance with the applied legislation.

== Mandates ==
- Auditing the accounts, cash, stamps, as well as verifying the financial documents, vouchers, and supplies of any public entities at any time.
- Auditing any financial transactions not stated above as it may find it necessary for the purpose of conducting its audit. It is entitled to have access in any public entity to all fiscal and Financial transaction at any stage of its audit, whether such transactions relates to revenue or expenditure. It shall call for or question directly the accounting officers who are in charge of these accounts.
- Conducting any examinations as it may find it necessary to ensure that the accounts are properly maintained, and that the actions adopted against irregularities and fraudulent acts are adequate and effective. It may bring to notice any gap that appears to it in the financial and administrative legislation whether it is related to finance or administration. It shall verify whether laws, regulations and instructions related to finance and accounts are fully complied with, and shall bring into notice any cases of noncompliance.
- Having access to all reports and information submitted by the financial inspectors, whether they have been financial inspectors or administrative inspectors, on matters pertaining to finance or administrative issues, as well as reports relating to investigations on financial or administrative irregularities.

== Auditied entities ==
=== Government ministries ===
- Prime Ministry
- Ministries of Jordan

=== Government bodies ===
- Audit Bureau
- Central Bank of Jordan
- Civil Aviation Regulatory Commission
- Civil Status and Passport Department
- Jordan Customs Department
- Department of Statistics
- The Executive Privatization Commission
- Free Zones Corporation
- General Intelligence Directorate
- Government Tenders Department
- Higher Council for Science and Technology
- Insurance Commission
- Jordan Institute for Public Administration
- Jordan Securities Commission
- Greater Amman Municipality
- National Energy Research Center
- National Information Technology Center
- Department of the National Library
- Natural Resources Authority
- Public Security Directorate
- Land Transport Regulatory Commission
- Royal Jordanian Geographic Center
- Telecommunications Regulatory Commission
- The General Corporation for the Environment Protection
- The National Assembly
- Higher Media Council

=== Institutions ===
- University of Jordan
- Hashemite University
- Al al-Bayt University
- Al-Balqa` Applied University
- Yarmouk University

== International cooperation and affiliations ==
- Member of the International Organization of Supreme Audit Institutions
- Member of the Asian Organization of Supreme Audit Institutions
- Member of the Arab Organization of Supreme Audit Institutions
