= Auditor General of Pakistan =

Anti-corruption audit agency

- محاسبِ اعلٰی پاکستان

Agency overview
- Formed: 14 August 1947
- Preceding agency: Comptroller & Auditor General of Pakistan
- Jurisdiction: Government of Pakistan
- Headquarters: Constitution Avenue, Islamabad
- Employees: 4,383 (2018)
- Annual budget: Rs. 4.46 billion (US$16 million) (2018)
- Agency executive: Muhammad Ajmal Gondal, Auditor General of Pakistan
- Website: www.agp.gov.pk

The Auditor General of Pakistan (Urdu: محاسبِ اعلٰی پاکستان) is a government organization and the prime and supreme audit institution (SAI) in the country for ensuring public accountability and fiscal transparency and oversight in governmental operations. The organization is expected to bring improvements in the financial discipline and internal control environment in the executive departments for minimizing the possibility of waste and fraud.

== Appointments ==
The Auditor General is appointed by the President of Pakistan. His reports are presented to the Public Accounts Committees (PAC) of the National, Provincial, and District assemblies. His mandate enables him to strengthen the legislative oversight by providing an independent and objective assessment of the process of governance at the federal and provincial levels.

== Qualification ==
=== Budget ===
The budget of the Auditor General is classified as charged expenditure, which means it is not voted upon by the Parliament, giving a degree of independence to the office. The Auditor General is assisted by a staff of about 1,500 qualified officers.

=== Constitutional position ===
The 1973 Constitution of Pakistan lays down the role and powers of the Auditor General as follows:

;Article 168. Auditor-General of Pakistan

1. There shall be an Auditor-General of Pakistan, who shall be appointed by the President.
2. Before entering upon office, the Auditor-General shall make before the Chief Justice of Pakistan oath in the form set out in the Third Schedule.
3. The terms and conditions of service, including the term of office, of the Auditor-General shall be determined by Act of Majlis-e-Shoora (Parliament) and, until so determined, by [156] Order of the President.
4. The Auditor-General shall not be removed from office except in the like manner and on the like grounds as a Judge of the Supreme Court.
5. At any time when the office of the Auditor-General is vacant or the Auditor-General is absent or is unable to perform the functions of his office due to any cause, such other person as the President may direct shall act as Auditor-General and perform the functions of that office.

— Government of Pakistan, Article 168, Constitution of Pakistan

;Article 169. Functions and powers of Auditor-General

The Auditor-General shall, in relation to-

(a) the accounts of the Federation and of the Provinces; and
(b) the accounts of any authority or body established by the Federation or a Province, perform such functions and exercise such powers as may be determined by or under Act of Majlis-e-Shoora (Parliament) and, until so determined, by Order of the President.

— Government of Pakistan, Article 169, Constitution of Pakistan

;Article 170. Power of Auditor-General to give directions as to accounts The accounts of the Federation and of the Provinces shall be kept in such form and in accordance with such principles and methods as the Auditor-General may, with the approval of the President, prescribe

— Government of Pakistan, Article 170, Constitution of Pakistan

Preceded by Javaid Jehangir	Muhammad Ajmal Gondal; 15 September 2021 – Present	Succeeded by present
