= Commission Supérieure des Comptes =

Supreme public audit institution in Monaco

Commission Supérieure des Comptes (Board of Auditors) is the supreme audit institution in the Principality of Monaco. Its main functions are audit of the accounts, budgetary and financial management of Monaco, the commune and public institutions. The Board of Auditors is required to submit annual reports to the Prince of Monaco. The reports provide the analysis of the accounts of the State of Monaco and are available on the official portal of the Board of Auditors. The Board of Auditors is a member of the International Organization of Supreme Audit Institutions (INTOSAI). Current Chairman of the Board is Jean-Pierre Gastinel, the Honorary Chamber President at the Court of Auditors (Paris).

== History ==
The Board of Auditors was established by Article 42 of the Monegasque Constitution on 17 December 1962 to oversee the financial management of public accounts in the Principality of Monaco.

== Members ==
As of 2021 the members of the Board of Auditors are:

- Chairman: Jean-Pierre Gastinel, Honorary Chamber President at the Court of Auditors (Paris)
- Vice-president: Christian Descheemaeker, Honorary Chamber President at the Court of Auditors (Paris)
- Members:
  - Paul Hernu, Honorary Counselor-Master at the Court of Auditors (Paris)
  - Sylvie Esparre, Honorary Counselor-Master at the Court of Auditors (Paris)
  - Olivier Ortiz, Honorary Counselor-Master at the Court of Auditors (Paris)
  - Roberto Schmidt, Honorary Counselor-Master at the Court of Auditors (Paris)
