= Government performance auditing =

Government performance auditing focuses on improving how governments provide programs and services. While there is no one universally agreed upon definition, there are key definitions which capture the scope of government performance auditing. According to the US Government Auditing Standards, "Performance audits are defined as audits that provide findings or conclusions based on an evaluation of sufficient, appropriate evidence against criteria." Additionally, the International Organization of Supreme Audit Institutions defines performance auditing as "an independent examination of the efficiency and effectiveness of government undertakings, programs or organizations, with due regard to economy, and the aim of leading to improvements."

== History ==
Government performance auditing was developed in the late 1960s and shepherded by the United States Government Accountability Office, (the chief audit arm of the US federal government). Government performance auditing has since spread to Canada and Israel, and most American state governments, flourishing in other countries under the leadership of the International Organisation of Supreme Audit Institutions (INTOSAI).

In Canada the Auditor General of Canada has strongly advocated a similar approach to improve government at all levels. This complements other efforts in that country such as the FCM InfraGuide for best practice exchange of all routine municipal infrastructure management problems.

In Israel, the State Comptroller, originally serving in the role of the financial Comptroller and auditor general common through the British Commonwealth, has later assumed the functions of a Government Performance Auditor and of an Ombudsman.

== Auditing standards ==
Government audit organizations generally utilize established standards to conduct performance audits. In the United States, audit organizations use either Generally Accepted Government Auditing Standards, known as the Yellow Book, or the Institute of Internal Auditors's International Professional Practices Framework, known as the Red Book.

The US Government Accountability Office (GAO) promulgates the Yellow Book. In July 2018, GAO issued a new revision of the Yellow Book , which supersedes the 2011 revision. The 2018 revision is effective for financial audits, attestation engagements, and reviews of financial statements for periods ending on or after June 30, 2020, and for performance audits beginning on or after July 1, 2019. The Yellow Book in current usage was issued in December 2011, which is referred to as the 2011 Standards . For performance audits, provisions of the 2011 Standards guide any performance audit starting after December 15, 2011. The effective date for financial audits and attestation engagements is for periods ending on or after December 15, 2012.

== Government Audit Organizations ==
The Association of Local Governments Auditors (ALGA) represents the central professional organization for local government audit organizations in the United States and Canada. ALGA was formed in 1989 and has over 300 organizational members and more than 2,000 individual members of ALGA.

The International Organization of Supreme Audit Institutions(INTOSAI) operates as an umbrella organisation for the external government audit community. For more than 50 years it has provided an institutionalised framework for supreme audit institutions to promote development and transfer of knowledge, improve government auditing worldwide and enhance professional capacities, standing and influence of member SAIs in their respective countries. In keeping with INTOSAI's motto, 'Experientia mutua omnibus prodest', the exchange of experience among INTOSAI members and the findings and insights which result, are a guarantee that government auditing continuously progresses with new developments.

INTOSAI is an autonomous, independent and non-political organisation. It is a non-governmental organisation with special consultative status with the Economic and Social Council (ECOSOC) of the United Nations.

INTOSAI was founded in 1953 at the initiative of Emilio Fernandez Camus, then President of the SAI of Cuba. At that time, 34 SAIs met for the 1st INTOSAI Congress in Cuba. At present INTOSAI has 190 Full Members and 4 Associated Members.

== International definition ==
INTOSAI - International Organization of Supreme Audit Institutions has published the following definition of Performance Audit:

Performance auditing is an independent examination of the efficiency and effectiveness of government undertakings, programs or organizations, with due regard to economy, and the aim of leading to improvements.

== See also ==
- Supreme audit institution
- Performance audit
- Golden Fleece Award
