= Legal auditing =

According to the National Association of Legal Fee Analysis, legal auditing is a litigation management practice and risk management tool, used by insurance and other consumers of legal services, to determine if hourly billing errors, abuses, and inefficiencies exist by carefully examining and identifying unreasonable attorney fees and expenses. Because the majority of corporate law firms charge clients on an hourly basis, and base attorney promotion and compensation almost entirely on the number of hours billed, rather than the results achieved for clients, lawyers and law firms have much incentive to bill as many hours as possible, and little incentive to work efficiently or to bill fewer hours. According to the California State Bar, most lawyers who block-bill their time inflate each client bill by 10-30 percent, and at the average national billing rate of $661 per hour (as of April 2012) that means that most big-firm lawyers overcharge clients anywhere from $150,000 to $400,000 each year. According to global e-billing standards LEDES partner, Legal Solutions Group (LSG), legal auditing must include reference to guideline non-compliance (GNC) codes, which should be established by consumers of legal services, such as enterprises and insurers. Best practices include ensuring the appropriate title of legal representation, paralegal vs. partner, handles a given task.

== Methods ==
Legal auditors conduct a detailed analysis of original time records, attorney work production, expenses and hourly rate benchmarks. The purpose of a legal bill auditing is to save money for the insurance company and their clients. Many audits measure performance and quality of services in addition to cost alone. Legal Bill Auditors may be responsible for monitoring the matter as it progresses for purposes of giving a second opinion in major cases or as a post-mortem. Legal bill audits give insurance companies and their clients peace of mind and avoid possible future mistakes.

In 2006, the firm Stuart Maue claimed to have conducted the largest legal audit on record during the OxyContin litigation, involving claims for attorney fees and expenses amounting to over $400,000,000 billed and audited, with the final negotiated settlement resulting in a reduction of $200,000,000 from the total billed amount.

In 2011, Forbes ran an article discussing the excessive legal fees in the Madoff litigation.
