= Performance audit =

Performance audit refers to an independent examination of a program, function, operation or the management systems and procedures of a governmental or non-profit entity to assess whether the entity is achieving economy, efficiency and effectiveness in the employment of available resources. The examination is objective and systematic, generally using structured and professionally adopted methodologies.

In most countries, performance audits of governmental activities are carried out by the external audit bodies at federal or state level. Many of these audit bodies have established guides for conducting performance audits which explain how performance audits are planned, conducted and its results reported.

INTOSAI, the International Association of Supreme Audit Institutions, has published generally accepted principles of performance auditing in its implementation guidelines. In the United States, the standard for government performance audits is the Generally Accepted Government Auditing Standards (GAGAS), often referred to as the "yellow book", maintained by the federal Government Accountability Office (GAO). Similarly, the European Court of Auditors (ECA) has developed a performance audit methodology for its audits of the sound financial management of the European Commission and the programmes funded through the EU budget.

Performance audits may also be conducted by internal auditors who are employees of the entity being audited. However, some national governments require agencies, departments and branches to periodically retain outside auditors to conduct them.

In the US, all auditors who follow GAGAS standards are required to maintain independence, supervision, continuing professional education, and conduct the audit using a specific process designed to increase the quality of the audit and reduce the politicization of audit work. Although there are separate professional credentials and certifications for Financial Auditors, the persons that conduct Performance Audits in the USA are often Certified Public Accountants, Certified Internal Auditors, Certified Responsible Government Auditors, or have a broad background in public policy, business or public administration.

The scope of performance audits may include the detection of fraud, waste and abuse, although often these are not included in the scope. Prior to engaging in a performance audit, the auditor must have a scope and plan defined which will be used to guide the audit process.

Performance auditing differs from performance measurement, the latter being the responsibility of management of the entity. In addition, performance measurement may include a broad variety of activities that do not meet the rigour of an independent external assessment.

== See also ==
- Government performance auditing
- Total quality management
