= INTOSAI Development Initiative =

Body of the International Organization of Supreme Audit Institutions

- Abbreviation: IDI
- Formation: 1986
- Legal status: Foundation
- Purpose: Capacity development of supreme audit institutions
- Headquarters: Oslo, Norway
- Region served: Global
- Official languages: Arabic; English; French; Spanish
- Director General: Einar Gørrissen
- Parent organization: International Organization of Supreme Audit Institutions
- Staff: 36
- Website: idi.no

The INTOSAI Development Initiative is a body of the International Organization of Supreme Audit Institutions (INTOSAI) which supports capacity development of supreme audit institutions (SAIs) in developing countries. Founded in 1986, the organization was headquartered in Canada until 2001, when it moved to Norway. It is currently hosted by the Office of the Auditor General of Norway.

== Activities ==
The INTOSAI Development Initiative engages in a variety of support activities for SAIs around the world, including delivering online and in-person training, holding workshops, developing global public goods, and improving engagement between SAIs and stakeholders. It is also working with SAIs in monitoring the implementation of the Sustainable Development Goals.

In addition, the organization conducts research on SAIs and publishes a triannual stocktaking report covering the status of audit institutions in every country.

== Funding ==
The organization is funded by the Austrian Development Agency, French Ministry of Europe and Foreign Affairs, International Fund for Agricultural Development, Irish Aid, Ministry for Foreign Affairs (Finland), Ministry of Foreign Affairs (Estonia), Swedish International Development Cooperation Agency, Swiss State Secretariat for Economic Affairs) and USAID, among others.
