= Board of Audit =

Supreme audit institution of Japan

- 会計検査院; Kaikeikensain
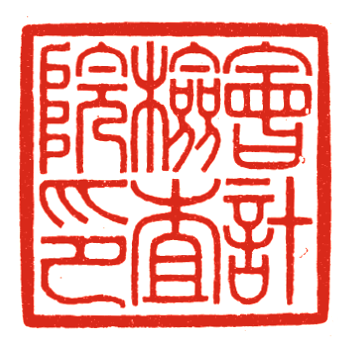
- Board of Audit seal (created 1881)

- logo

Agency overview
- Formed: 1880
- Jurisdiction: Japan
- Headquarters: 3-2-2 Kasumigaseki, Chiyoda-ku, Tokyo 100-8941, Japan
- Employees: 1,251 (as of April 2021)
- Agency executives: Yūji Morita, President; Dr. Yayoi Tanaka, Commissioner; Hajime Okamura, Commissioner; Yuuhei Harada, Secretary General; Yoshinao Shinohara, Deputy Secretary General
- Parent agency: Government of Japan
- Website: Official website

The Board of Audit (会計検査院, Kaikeikensain) reviews government expenditures and submits an annual report to the Diet. Article 90 of the Constitution of Japan and the Board of Audit Act of 1947 give this body substantial independence from both cabinet and Diet control.

In 1968, it hosted the INCOSAI VI, the sixth triennial convention of the International Organization of Supreme Audit Institutions.

The headquarters is located at 3-2-2 Kasumigaseki, Chiyoda-ku, Tokyo 100-8941, Japan.

== History ==
The origins of the Board of Audit can be traced back to a division established in 1869 under the Daijō-kan. It was reorganized as an auditing organ under the Daijō-kan in 1880.

Article 90 of the Constitution of 1947 states: "Final accounts of the expenditures and revenues of the State shall be audited annually by a Board of Audit and submitted by the Cabinet to the Diet, together with the statement of audit, during the fiscal year immediately following the period covered." The original Japanese uses the word subete to indicate that all state expenditures and revenues are subject to audit. In 2013, the Abe government tried to circumvent this under the State Secrecy Law, but relented in 2015.
