= Rigsrevisionen =

Audit agency of the Kingdom of Denmark

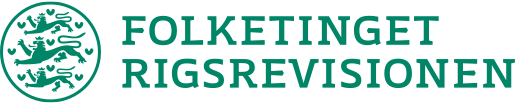

National Audit Agency overview
- Type: Independent institution of the Folketing
- Jurisdiction: Kingdom of Denmark
- National Audit Agency executive: Rigsrevisor (Auditor General)
- Parent department: Folketing (Danish Parliament)

Rigsrevisionen is the national audit agency of the Kingdom of Denmark and an independent institution of the Folketing.

It is responsible for auditing the expenditure of Danish central government, and also public-sector bodies in which the government has an economic interest, such as hospitals and the Danish Security and Intelligence Service.

In July 2011, Rigsrevision made serious criticisms of the Royal Danish Navy's finances.

Auditing is not limited to narrow financial terms, such as investigating the stability of the banking system; it also checks that public services provide value for taxpayers' money in a more general sense. For instance, in 2011, Rigsrevisionen launched an investigation into the ability of water suppliers and the environment ministry to protect consumers from traces of herbicides in drinking water.

Rigsrevisionen was part of the Economy ministry from 1971 to 1991.
