= Court of Accounts (Turkey) =

Supreme governmental accounting body of Turkey

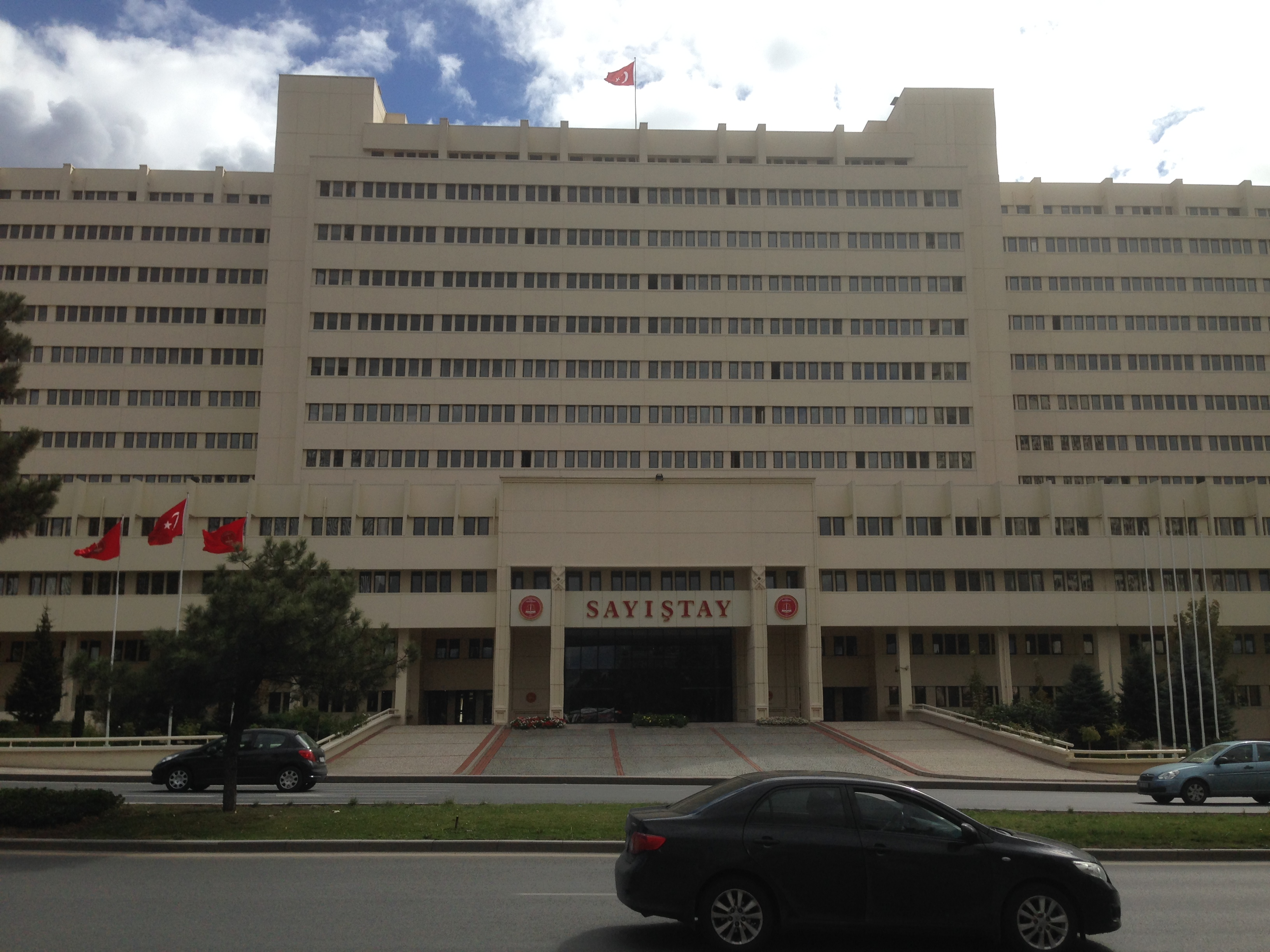
Court of Accounts building in Ankara

Old logo of the Court of Accounts when it was known as the Divan-i Ali-i Muhasebat

The Court of Accounts (Turkish: Sayıştay) is the supreme governmental accounting body of Turkey responsible of the comptrolling of the public accounts and the auditing of the accountancy of the political parties, in accordance with the Constitution.

The Court of Accounts has roots going back to the Ottoman Empire. Şahin İpek states that "When the supreme audit institutions emerged in the west, Ottoman Court of Accounts was established in 1862 under the name of Divan-i Ali-i Muhasebat within the framework of the reform movements, referred to as “Islahat Hareketleri” in the Ottoman Empire".

The Court of Accounts (TCA) website states that the court "carries out regularity (financial and compliance) and performance audits. Financial audits consist of an evaluation and an opinion on the accuracy of public administrative bodies' financial reports and statements, and whether or not those bodies' financial decisions and transactions and any programs and activities are compliant with the law."
