= Swedish National Audit Office =

Swedish administrative authority

- Riksrevisionen

Agency overview
- Formed: 1 July 2003
- Preceding agencies: Statskontoret (1680–1920); Riksdagens revisorer (1867–2003); Riksräkenskapsverket (1920–1963); Riksrevisionsverket (1963–2003)
- Headquarters: (Sweden) Stockholm

The Swedish National Audit Office (Swedish: Riksrevisionen) is the agency responsible for oversight of the state finances through financial and performance audits of state agencies, state-owned companies and the Government of Sweden. It serves directly under the Riksdag and is therefore independent of the Cabinet. All state agencies are required to submit copies of their annual accounts and reports to this office for review.

The mission of the Swedish National Audit Office is to examine the government's activities in order to contribute to the effective management of state administration. The agency is led by one Auditor General (riksrevisor) who is appointed for a seven-year term without the possibility of re-appointment. The Auditor General decide independently on aspects of the state government to be audited, how to do its investigations. The independence of the office and the Auditor General is specified in Chapter 13 of the Regeringsformen, which is part of the Constitution of Sweden. The current Auditor General for the period 2017–2024 is Helena Lindberg.

== History ==
Auditing responsibilities in regards to the finances of the Swedish Government first began in 1530 when King Gustav Vasa set up the Räntekammaren, soon to become the Kammarkollegiet under control of the Lord High Treasurer of Sweden. Under King John III, the annual Rikshufvudboken was published which contained a breakdown of all national finances of Sweden within that year. In 1680, King Charles XI moved all governmental auditing responsibilities from the Kammarkollegiet to a new government agency called the Swedish Agency for Administrative Development, which lasted until 1920 when the auditing portion of the Swedish Agency for Administrative Development was transferred to a new agency called Riksräkenskapsverket, under the control of the Ministry of Finance. In 1963, the Riksräkenskapsverket was renamed as the National Swedish Accounting and Audit Bureau.

Separately in 1867, the Parliamentary (Riksdag) Auditors was formed as an administrative authority of the Riksdag (the Swedish parliament) to audit and review all activities of the Riksdag.

On 15 December 2000, the Riksdag decided to merge both the Auditor General of the National Swedish Accounting and Audit Bureau and the Parliamentary (Riksdag) Auditors into the present-day Swedish National Audit Office, which took effect on 1 July 2003. The final Auditor General of the Auditor General of the National [Swedish] Accounting and Audit Bureau, Inga-Britt Ahlenius, was against said merger, as she claimed in several statements to the media that the merger would limit the Swedish National Audit Office's ability to act independently from the government.

== See also ==
- Office of the Auditor General of Norway (Riksrevisjonen) - the corresponding agency in Norway
- Rigsrevisionen - the corresponding agency in Denmark
- National Audit Office of Finland (fi: Valtiontalouden tarkastusvirasto; sv: Statens revisionsverk) - the corresponding agency in Finland
