= Jordan Rift Valley =

Geographic region in the Levant

Coordinates: 32°19′02″N 35°34′12″E

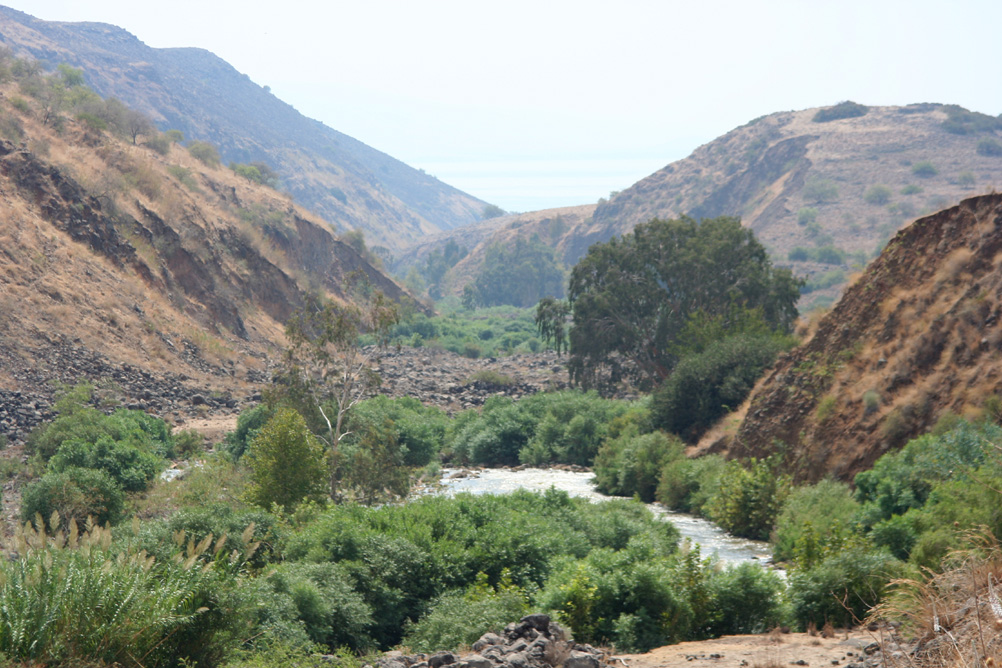
Bik'at Hayarden

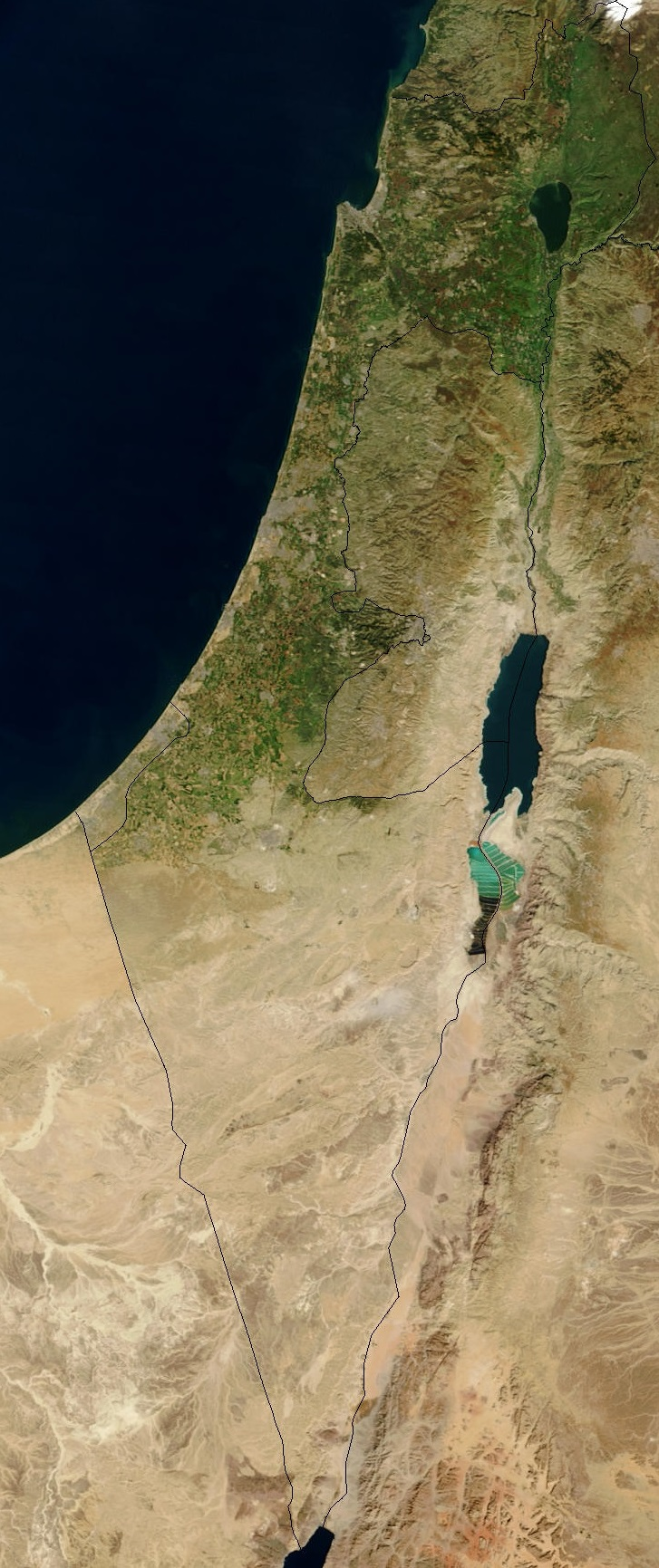
A 2003 satellite image of the region showing the Jordan Rift Valley

The Jordan Rift Valley, also Jordan Valley (Modern Hebrew: בקעת הירדן Bik'at Hayarden, Biblical Hebrew: בִּקְעָת הַיַרְדֵּן, romanized: Biqʿāṯ hay-Yardēn, Arabic: الغور, romanized: al-Ghawr), is an elongated endorheic basin located in modern-day Israel, Jordan, Palestine and Syria. This geographic region includes the entire length of the Jordan River from its sources, through the Hula Valley, the Korazim Plateau, the Sea of Galilee, the Jordan Valley, all the way to the Dead Sea, the lowest land elevation on Earth – and then continues through the Arabah depression, the Gulf of Aqaba whose shorelines it incorporates, until finally reaching the Red Sea proper at the Straits of Tiran.

== History and physical features ==
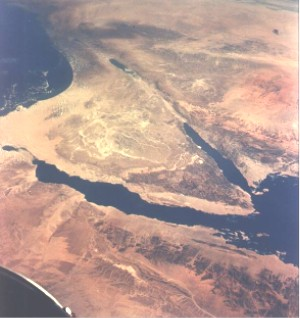
Northern section of the Great Rift Valley. The Sinai Peninsula is in center and the Dead Sea and Jordan River valley above.

Since the Miocene (23.8 – 5.3 Myr ago), the Jordan Rift Valley has existed. Alternatively, the disconnection may have been caused by a fall in sea level, or by a combination of both factors—researchers have not yet reached a consensus.

The geological and environmental evolution of the valley since its inception in the Oligocene can be seen in a variety of sedimentary and magmatic rock units, preserved as continuous sequences in the deeper basins. The outcropping formations around the basins represent alternating deposition and erosion phases.

The lowest point in the Jordan Rift Valley is in the Dead Sea, the lowest spot of which is 790 m (2,590 ft) below sea level. The shore of the Dead Sea is the lowest dry land spot on Earth, at 400 m (1,300 ft) below sea level.

=== Dead Sea Transform ===
The plate boundary that extends through the valley is variously called the Dead Sea Transform (DST) or Dead Sea Rift. The boundary separates the Arabian plate from the African plate, connecting the divergent plate boundary in the Red Sea (the Red Sea Rift) to the East Anatolian Fault in Turkey.

The DST fault system is generally considered to be a transform fault that has accommodated a 105-kilometre (65 mi) northwards displacement of the Arabian plate. This interpretation is based on observation of offset markers, such as river terraces, gullies and archaeological features, giving horizontal slip rates of several mm per year over the last few million years. GPS data give similar rates of present-day movement of the Arabian plate relative to the Africa plate. It has also been proposed that the fault zone is a rift system that is an incipient oceanic spreading center, the northern extension of the Red Sea Rift.

The rift valley was struck by the 1033 Jordan Valley earthquake, believed to have been produced along the DST fault system. It caused widespread destruction, a tsunami, and killed 70,000 people.

=== Seismic risk ===
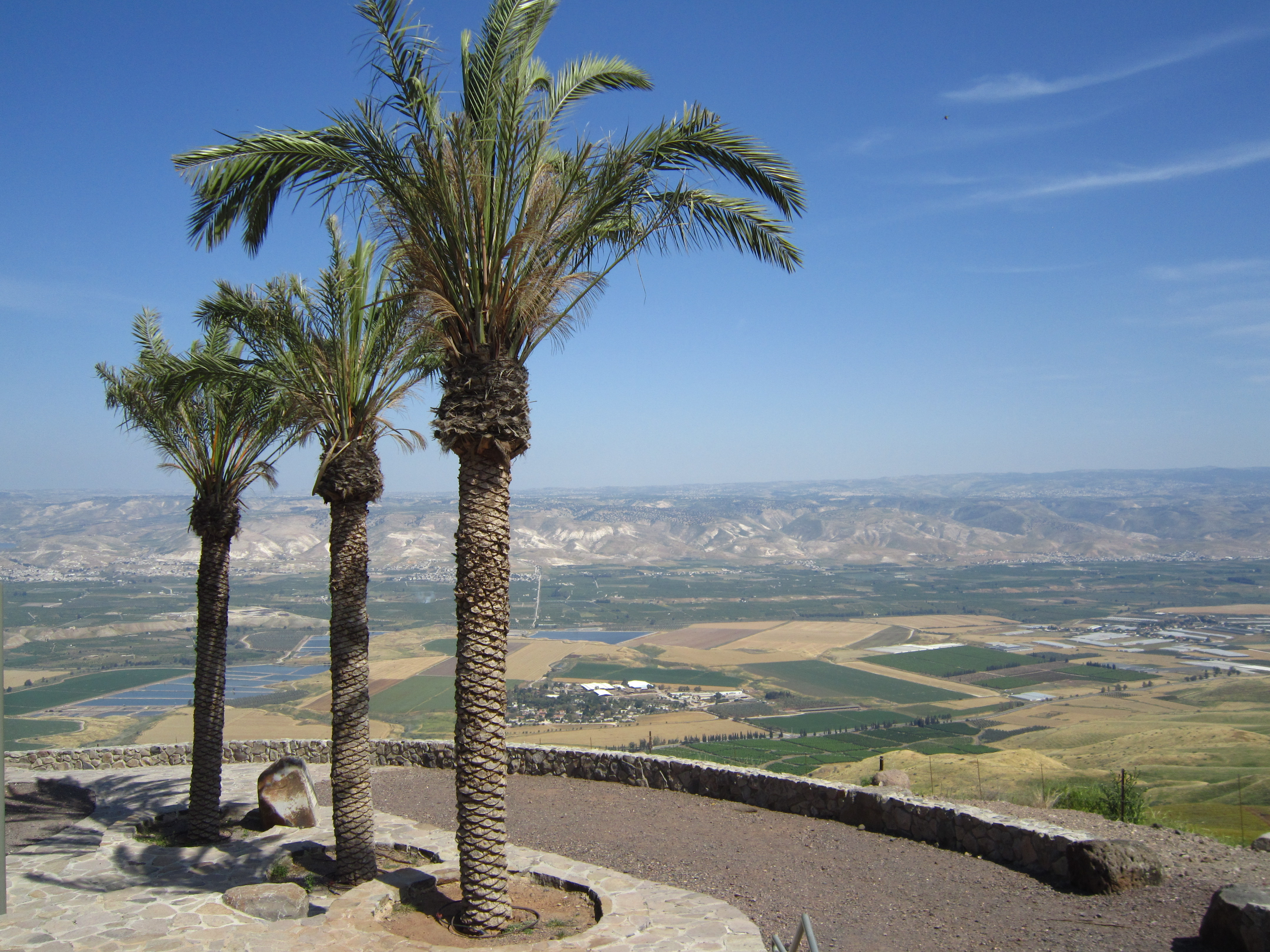
View of the Jordan Valley, where the earthquake occurred

The 1033 AD event was the last large earthquake on the Jordan Valley Fault. Given the estimated slip rate is 4.9 ± 0.2 mm (0.1929 ± 0.0079 in) per year, approximately 5 m (16 ft) of potential slip has been accumulated. An estimated 3.5–5 m (11–16 ft) of slip could be produced during a future earthquake along a 110 km (68 mi) × 20 km (12 mi) fault area. Such an event would suggest an earthquake of M_{w} 7.4, posing a great seismic threat to the region.

In late 2020, researchers at Tel Aviv University said that an earthquake of magnitude 6.5 is expected to occur in the area, resulting in many fatalities. Researchers also stated that the frequency of large earthquakes in the region is significantly underestimated. Previous studies suggested a recurrence interval of 10,000 years for magnitude 7.5 earthquakes, but the researchers said the figure was 1,300 to 1,400 years. Yosef Shapira, the then State Comptroller of Israel, said that a major earthquake in Israel could kill up to 7,000 people if safety recommendations are not enforced. Reports of the years 2001, 2004 and 2011 found that the Israeli government did not fund any retrofitting works to old construction. Although the government said in 2008 that it would retrofit hospitals and schools, no major changes were made.

== Climate ==
Climate data for Dead Sea, Sedom (-390m)
| Month | Jan | Feb | Mar | Apr | May | Jun | Jul | Aug | Sep | Oct | Nov | Dec | Year |
|---|---|---|---|---|---|---|---|---|---|---|---|---|---|
| Record high °C (°F) | 26.4 (79.5) | 30.4 (86.7) | 33.8 (92.8) | 42.5 (108.5) | 45.0 (113.0) | 46.4 (115.5) | 47.0 (116.6) | 44.5 (112.1) | 43.6 (110.5) | 40.0 (104.0) | 35.0 (95.0) | 28.5 (83.3) | 47.0 (116.6) |
| Mean daily maximum °C (°F) | 20.5 (68.9) | 21.7 (71.1) | 24.8 (76.6) | 29.9 (85.8) | 34.1 (93.4) | 37.6 (99.7) | 39.7 (103.5) | 39.0 (102.2) | 36.5 (97.7) | 32.4 (90.3) | 26.9 (80.4) | 21.7 (71.1) | 30.4 (86.7) |
| Daily mean °C (°F) | 16.6 (61.9) | 17.7 (63.9) | 20.8 (69.4) | 25.4 (77.7) | 29.4 (84.9) | 32.6 (90.7) | 34.7 (94.5) | 34.5 (94.1) | 32.4 (90.3) | 28.6 (83.5) | 23.1 (73.6) | 17.9 (64.2) | 26.1 (79.0) |
| Mean daily minimum °C (°F) | 12.7 (54.9) | 13.7 (56.7) | 16.7 (62.1) | 20.9 (69.6) | 24.7 (76.5) | 27.6 (81.7) | 29.6 (85.3) | 29.9 (85.8) | 28.3 (82.9) | 24.7 (76.5) | 19.3 (66.7) | 14.1 (57.4) | 21.9 (71.4) |
| Record low °C (°F) | 5.4 (41.7) | 6.0 (42.8) | 8.0 (46.4) | 11.5 (52.7) | 19.0 (66.2) | 23.0 (73.4) | 26.0 (78.8) | 26.8 (80.2) | 24.2 (75.6) | 17.0 (62.6) | 9.8 (49.6) | 6.0 (42.8) | 5.4 (41.7) |
| Average precipitation mm (inches) | 7.8 (0.31) | 9.0 (0.35) | 7.6 (0.30) | 4.3 (0.17) | 0.2 (0.01) | 0.0 (0.0) | 0.0 (0.0) | 0.0 (0.0) | 0.0 (0.0) | 1.2 (0.05) | 3.5 (0.14) | 8.3 (0.33) | 41.9 (1.65) |
| Average precipitation days | 3.3 | 3.5 | 2.5 | 1.3 | 0.2 | 0.0 | 0.0 | 0.0 | 0.0 | 0.4 | 1.6 | 2.8 | 15.6 |
| Average relative humidity (%) | 41 | 38 | 33 | 27 | 24 | 23 | 24 | 27 | 31 | 33 | 36 | 41 | 32 |
Source: Israel Meteorological Service

Climate data for Gilgal (−255m)
| Month | Jan | Feb | Mar | Apr | May | Jun | Jul | Aug | Sep | Oct | Nov | Dec | Year |
|---|---|---|---|---|---|---|---|---|---|---|---|---|---|
| Record high °C (°F) | 28.0 (82.4) | 33.5 (92.3) | 40.5 (104.9) | 44.7 (112.5) | 46.5 (115.7) | 47.5 (117.5) | 48.1 (118.6) | 49.0 (120.2) | 45.7 (114.3) | 44.2 (111.6) | 37.9 (100.2) | 32.5 (90.5) | 49.0 (120.2) |
| Mean daily maximum °C (°F) | 20.1 (68.2) | 21.6 (70.9) | 25.6 (78.1) | 30.3 (86.5) | 35.6 (96.1) | 38.7 (101.7) | 40.4 (104.7) | 40.0 (104.0) | 37.7 (99.9) | 33.8 (92.8) | 27.7 (81.9) | 22.1 (71.8) | 31.1 (88.1) |
| Daily mean °C (°F) | 14.5 (58.1) | 15.5 (59.9) | 18.7 (65.7) | 22.8 (73.0) | 27.3 (81.1) | 30.5 (86.9) | 32.4 (90.3) | 32.5 (90.5) | 30.5 (86.9) | 26.9 (80.4) | 21.1 (70.0) | 16.4 (61.5) | 24.1 (75.4) |
| Mean daily minimum °C (°F) | 8.9 (48.0) | 9.4 (48.9) | 11.8 (53.2) | 15.3 (59.5) | 19.1 (66.4) | 22.3 (72.1) | 24.5 (76.1) | 25.0 (77.0) | 23.2 (73.8) | 19.9 (67.8) | 14.4 (57.9) | 10.6 (51.1) | 17.0 (62.7) |
| Record low °C (°F) | 0.3 (32.5) | 0.0 (32.0) | 2.5 (36.5) | 3.0 (37.4) | 11.2 (52.2) | 15.2 (59.4) | 20.0 (68.0) | 19.5 (67.1) | 14.0 (57.2) | 12.1 (53.8) | 4.6 (40.3) | 0.2 (32.4) | 0.0 (32.0) |
Source: Israel Meteorological Service

== See also ==
- Geography of Israel
- Geography of Jordan
- Great Rift Valley
