= 1033 Jordan Valley earthquake =

Earthquake in the Levant

1033 Jordan Rift Valley earthquake
- Location within Israel
- Local date: 5 December 1033
- Magnitude: ~7.3 M_{w}
- Epicenter: 32.5°N 35.5°E
- Type: Strike-slip
- Areas affected: modern-day Israel and State of Palestine
- Max. intensity: MMI X (Extreme)
- Casualties: 70,000 dead

An earthquake struck the Jordan Rift Valley on December 5, AD 1033 and caused extreme devastation in the Levant region. It was part of a sequence of four strong earthquakes in the region between 1033 and 1035. Scholars have estimated the moment magnitude to be greater than 7.0 M_{w} and evaluated the Modified Mercalli intensity to X (Extreme). It triggered a tsunami along the Mediterranean coast, causing damage and fatalities. At least 70,000 people were killed in the disaster.

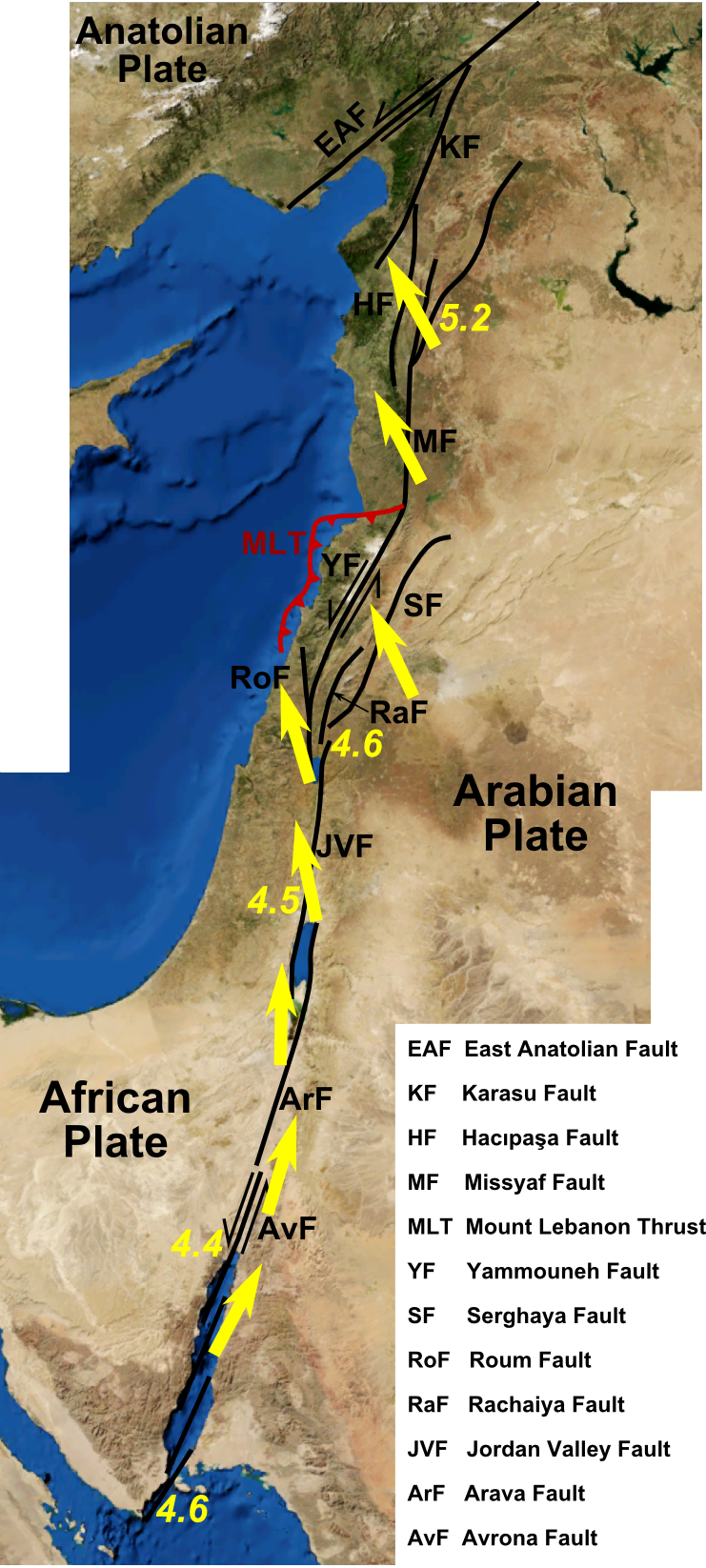
The Jordan Valley Fault (abbreviated JVF) was the source of the large earthquakes of 31 BC, AD 346, 749 and 1033.

== Tectonic setting ==
In the past 2,000 years of human history, documented earthquakes have been associated with the 1,100 km (680 mi) long Dead Sea Transform Fault System, a left-lateral transform boundary. Since the early Miocene, the fault system has accounted for between 110 km (68 mi) and 70–80 km (43–50 mi) of left-lateral displacement between the African and Arabian plates. While left-lateral strike-slip is dominant, the fault also displays features of normal and thrust faulting. The fault displays varying slip rates across its segments, 2–10 mm (0.079–0.394 in) per year. The Jordan Valley fault forms part of the larger system of faults that is collectively known as the Dead Sea Transform. This segment is 110 km (68 mi) long and trends north–south; beginning at the Dead Sea and terminating at the Sea of Galilee.

== Earthquake ==
The earthquake is thought to have ruptured the entire Jordan Valley Fault segment, based on reports of heavy damage reported from the Dead Sea to the Sea of Galilee. The historical record also showed that the pattern of damage was similar to another earthquake in AD 749. Both the 749 AD and 1033 AD earthquakes ruptured the Jordan Valley Faults with magnitudes exceeding 7.0. Earlier earthquakes in 31 BC and 363 AD are thought to have been caused by the same segment rupturing. Paleoseismological studies near Jericho and the Sea of Galilee revealed evidence of surface ruptures. Evident in the sedimentary layers are also signs of disturbed sediments thought to be caused by the earthquake.

Little research has addressed the magnitude of the earthquake, and there is a large variation in the range of estimated magnitudes. A 2004 study by Migowski and others estimated the magnitude at 7.1, based on studies of disturbed sedimentary layers. The magnitude has also been estimated at 6.0 to 7.1, although these figures has had their reliability and credibility questioned. Italy's National Institute of Geophysics and Volcanology estimated an equivalent magnitude based on macroseismic observations (M_{e}) of 7.3, and a 2020 earthquake catalog estimated that the earthquake had a moment magnitude of 7.3.

== Devastation ==
Heavy damage was reported in a north–south trend for 190 km (120 mi) from the Dead Sea to the Sea of Galilee. One-third of the city of Ramla was destroyed. Half of Nablus was destroyed and 300 residents died. The landscape around the city was also devastated. Acre experienced great damage and a high death toll. The cities of Banias and Jericho were also among those who suffered the greatest destruction. A landslide buried the village of al-Badan, killing all its residents and livestock. Landslides also destroyed other villages and killed most of their population. Banias was partially destroyed. In Syria, entire villages were "swallowed" by the earth, causing fatalities. In Gaza, the Great Mosque of Gaza and the surrounding minarets collapsed. A lighthouse in the city sustained heavy damage. Reports of serious damage also came from Ascalon. Damage was reported as far away as Egypt. Sahil A. Alsinawi and others reported a death toll of 70,000.

=== Jerusalem ===
Parts of the Walls of Jerusalem collapsed and many churches were damaged. A side of the Temple Mount and the Mihrab Daud, located near the Jaffa Gate, collapsed. The entire southern section of the city walls which enclosed Mount Zion above the Kidron Valley, which were built by Aelia Eudocia (the fifth-century wife of the Byzantine emperor Theodosius II), were abandoned by Fatimid caliph Al-Zahir li-i'zaz Din Allah who established major restoration projects that lasted from 1034 to 1038. It is believed to be the largest restoration project in the city's history. The Dome of the Rock was enforced with wooden beams to strengthen the structure. Wooden beams and mosaics were added to the al-Aqsa Mosque. Solomon's Stables and al-Aqsa Mosque were among the structures that underwent restoration.

=== Jericho ===
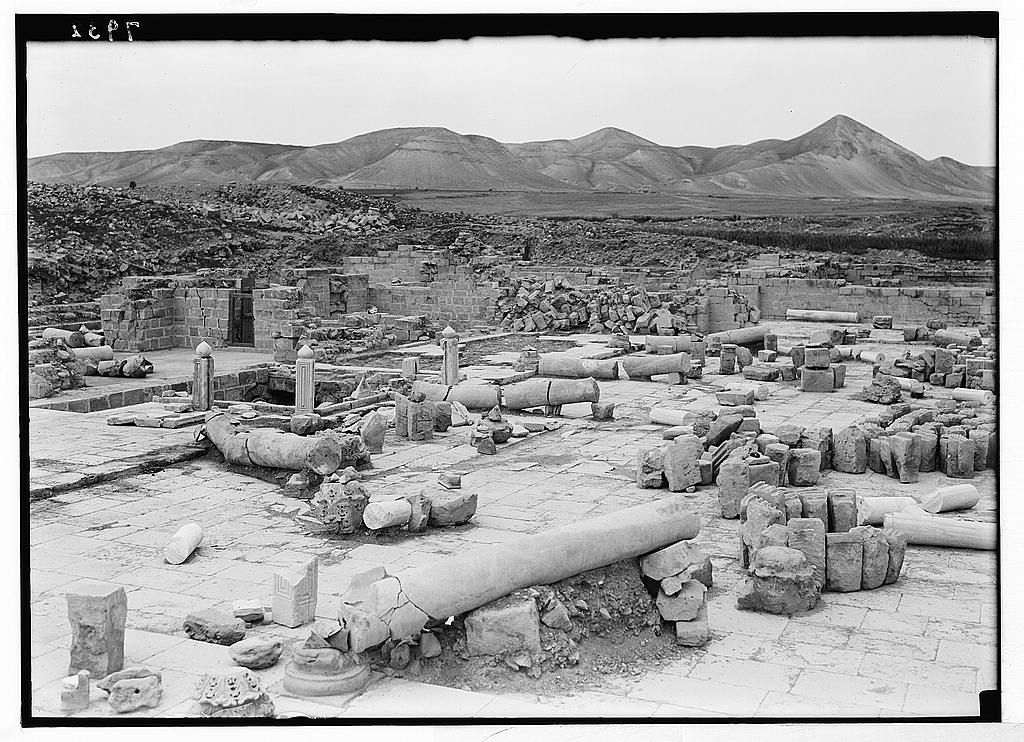
Shear fractures and column failures at Hisham's Palace, Jericho, photographed in the 1930s

Hisham's Palace in Jericho was destroyed; it was previously thought that the palace was destroyed during the AD 749 earthquake, but the relatively low intensity (VII) suggest it was not the responsible earthquake. Academic studies noted fracture alignments on the ruin floor. Evidence of column and wall failures were present. Geological faulting was also found in the excavated area; the ruins displayed up to 10 cm (3.9 in) of left-lateral faulting. Human remains discovered beneath the rubble of a collapsed arch were possibly caused by the earthquake. The Modified Mercalli intensity at the palace was assigned IX–X. It is possible that the palace site was abandoned after the earthquake and reoccupied sometime later.

=== Tsunami ===
A tsunami struck the coastal city of Acre. It was reported that the city port became dry for an hour, and a large wave arrived, partially destroying it. Waves were also reported along the coast of Lebanon. Greek seismologist Nicholas Ambraseys reported that the tsunami caused no damage or casualties inland, but this information is thought to be in confusion with another earthquake in 1068. The only tsunami casualties were those who scoured the exposed seafloor and drowned when it arrived. Additional shocks in April or May 1035 caused further damage and might be associated with tsunamis.

== Future threat ==
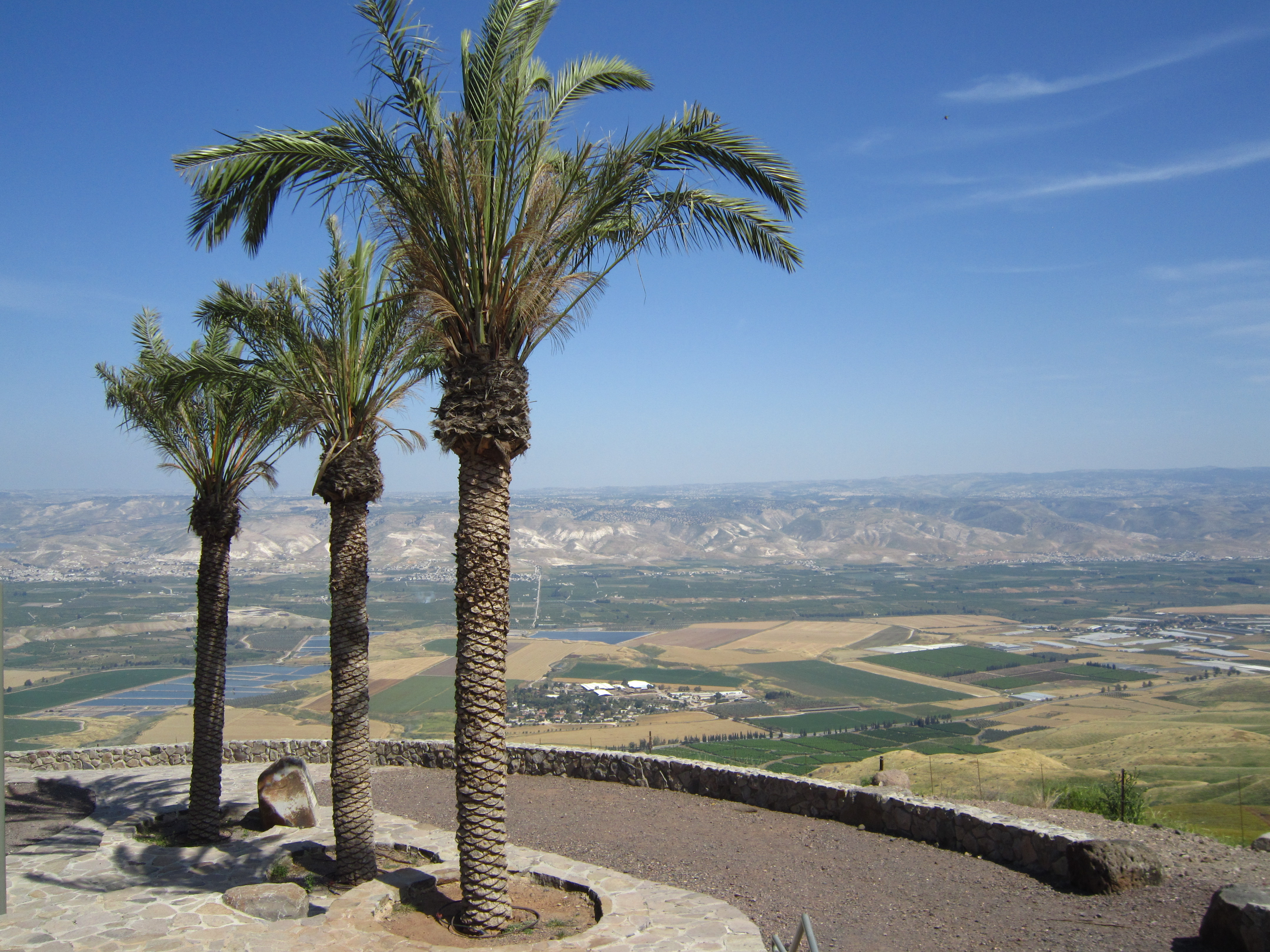
View of the Jordan Valley, where the earthquake occurred.

The 1033 AD event was the last large earthquake on the Jordan Valley Fault. Given the estimated slip rate is 4.9 ± 0.2 mm (0.1929 ± 0.0079 in) per year, approximately 5 m (16 ft) of potential slip has been accumulated. An estimated 3.5–5 m (11–16 ft) of slip could be produced during a future earthquake along a 110 km (68 mi) × 20 km (12 mi) fault area. Such an event would suggest an earthquake of M_{w} 7.4, posing a great seismic threat to the region.

In late 2020, researchers at Tel Aviv University said that an earthquake of magnitude 6.5 is expected to occur in the area, resulting in many fatalities. Researchers also stated that the frequency of large earthquakes in the region is significantly underestimated. Previous studies suggested a recurrence interval of 10,000 years for magnitude 7.5 earthquakes, but the researchers said the figure was 1,300 to 1,400 years. Yosef Shapira, the then State Comptroller of Israel, said that a major earthquake in Israel could kill up to 7,000 people if safety recommendations are not enforced. Reports of the years 2001, 2004 and 2011 found that the Israeli government did not fund any retrofitting works to old construction. Although the government said in 2008 that it would retrofit hospitals and schools, no major changes were made.

== See also ==
- List of earthquakes in the Levant
- List of historical earthquakes
