= Avigdor Nebenzahl =

Israeli Orthodox rabbi and posek (born 1935)

Rabbi Avigdor Nebenzahl
- אֲבִיגְדֹּר נֶבֶּנְצָל
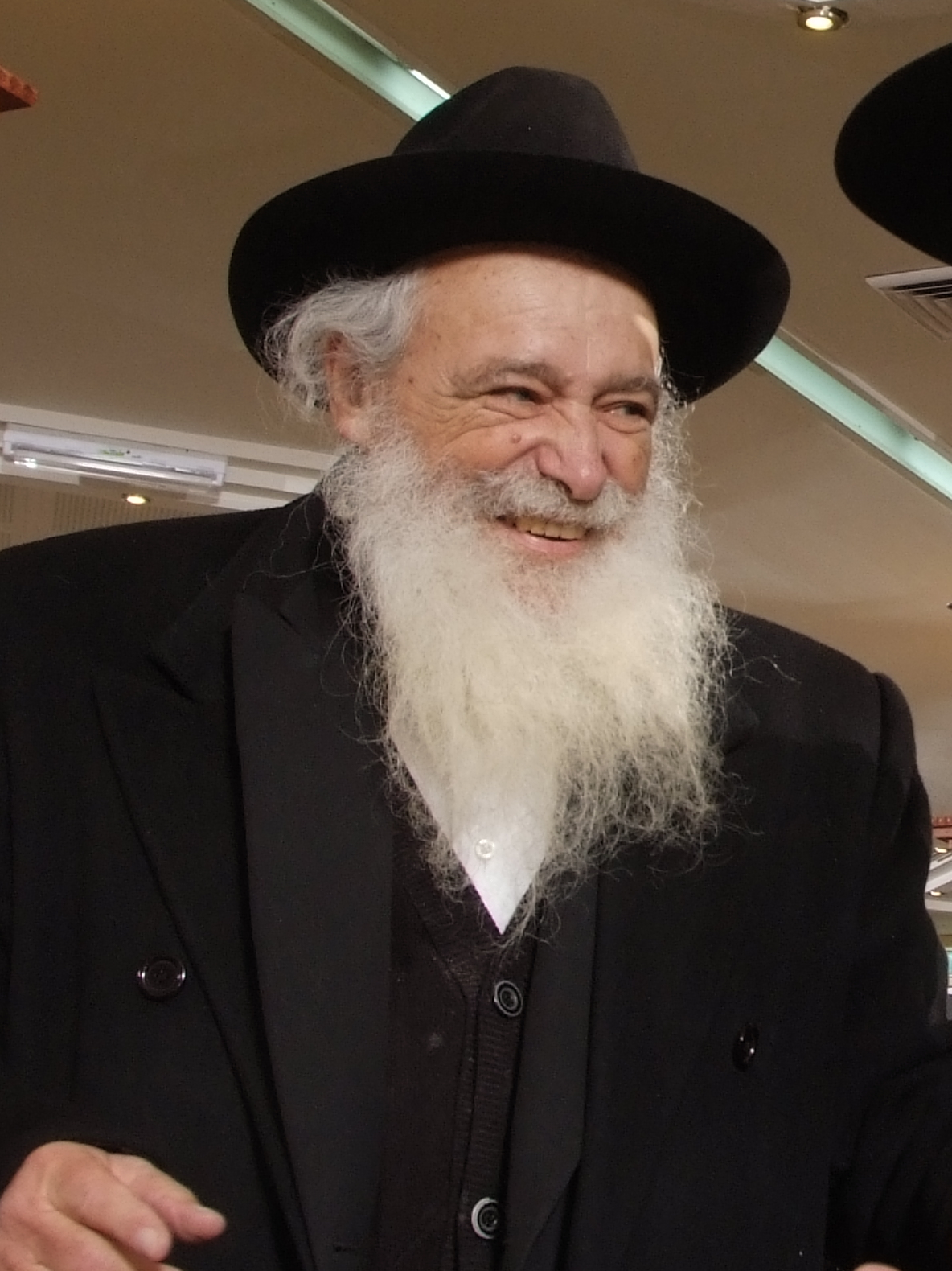

Personal life
- Born: 1935 (age 90–91)
- Spouse: Chaya Leah Galandauer
- Children: Chizkiyahu Nebenzahl
- Parent: Yitzhak Nebenzahl (father)

Religious life
- Religion: Judaism
- Denomination: Orthodox Judaism

Jewish leader
- Position: Rabbi
- Synagogue: Ramban Synagogue
- Yeshiva: Yeshivat Netiv Aryeh

Avigdor Nebenzahl (Hebrew: אֲבִיגְדֹּר נֶבֶּנְצָל; born 1935) is an Israeli Orthodox rabbi and posek. He is the senior rosh yeshiva at Yeshivat Netiv Aryeh, a faculty member at Yeshivat HaKotel, and rabbi of the Ramban Synagogue. Nebenzahl, previously, served as rabbi of the Old City of Jerusalem, before the post was handed over to his son Chizkiyahu Nebenzahl.

== Biography ==
Avigdor Nebenzahl was born to Yitzhak Nebenzahl, the State Comptroller of Israel from 1948 to 1981, Israel's Ombudsman from 1961 to 1981, and a senior officer in the Bank of Israel and the Israel Postal Bank. His sister, Plia Albeck, was head of the Civil Department of the State Prosecutor's Office for 24 years. Nebenzahl's first wife, Shifra Nebenzahl (née Finkel), died on February 12, 2016. Shifra was a member of the Mirrer Yeshiva family; her paternal grandfather, Eliezer Yehuda Finkel was its rosh yeshiva for 48 years. Her father, Chaim Zev Finkel, was a mashgiach ruchani (spiritual guidance counselor) of the yeshiva. Her brother-in-law, Aaron Chodosh, was a mashgiach there, and her brother Aryeh Finkel was the rosh yeshiva of its Brachfeld branch until his death on August 10, 2016. Nebenzahl remarried at age 83.

== Rabbinic career ==
Nebenzahl was a faculty member of the Mir Yeshiva in Jerusalem before accepting positions at Yeshivat HaKotel and Yeshivat Netiv Aryeh, where he has given weekly lectures. He hosts many of those students in his home for kiddush after Shabbat morning prayer services. Nebenzahl's scholarly works include a commentary on the Mishnah Berurah, books about the laws of the Jewish holidays and tractate Shabbat. He is the author of essays on the weekly Torah portion. Nebenzahl was Shlomo Zalman Auerbach's study partner for over 40 years. Joel Landau assisted Nebenzahl in publishing one of his first works.

== Views and opinions ==
Avigdor Nebenzahl

In 2004, Nebenzahl stated before an Israeli court that any Jew guilty of selling parts of what he termed the Land of Israel falls under the law of Din Rodef, meaning he is subject to being killed legally under religious law. In October of that year, Nebenzahl was one of the signatories to a letter of rabbis calling on members of the Israel Defense Forces to refuse to follow orders in connection with the Israeli disengagement from Gaza.

In 2017, Nebenzahl penned a letter to Chaim Kanievsky, in which he decried the Jerusalem Municipality for sponsoring interfaith Hanukkah parties. In the letter, he implored Kanievsky to "instruct the members of the Knesset, Rabbi Gafni and Rabbi Maklev, to cancel this disgrace and remove the wrath of God from our people even before this matter becomes a big phenomenon that will be much more difficult to stop afterwards".

Nebenzahl opposes Jewish tour groups to the Temple Mount. After Itamar Ben-Gvir led a group of Jewish worshippers onto the Temple Mount on Tisha B'Av in 2024, Nebenzahl and four other senior rabbis issued a video statement at the urging of Jerusalem mayor Moshe Lion—in Hebrew with Arabic subtitles—stating that it is strictly forbidden for Jews to enter the compound, and called for calm.

== Published works ==
Teshuvot Avigdor Halevi: She'elot u-teshuvot be-4 ḥelḳe ha-shulḥan ʻarukh tanakh ṿe-nośʼim shonim

Sefer Mi-Tsiyon mikhlal yofi : ḥidushim u-veʼurim ṿe-heʻarot

Yerushalayim be-moʻadeha

Sichot al ha-Torah
