= Uri Nissan Gnessin =

Russian-Jewish writer

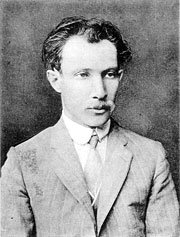
- Uri Nissan Gnessin
- Born: 1879; Starodub, Chernigov Governorate, Russian Empire
- Died: 1913 (aged 33–34); Warsaw, Congress Poland
- Occupation: Writer
- Writing career
- Language: Hebrew
- Notable works: Zilelei ha-Hayyim, BaGanim

Uri Nissan Gnessin (1879–1913) was a Russian-Jewish writer and a pioneer in modern Hebrew literature.

== Early life ==
He was born in Starodub, and grew up in the small town of Pochep, Orel province. His father was a rabbi and the head of a yeshiva in Pochep. His brother was Menahem Gnessin, a co-founder of the Habima Theatre. After attending cheder, Gnessin studied at his father's yeshiva, and there became friends with Yosef Haim Brenner, a fellow student. As a boy he wrote poetry and was interested in secular subjects; when he was 15 years old, he and Brenner together produced a literary journal that they distributed to a small circle of friends.

== Literary career and later years ==
Around 1899, when Gnessin was 18 years old, he was invited by Nahum Sokolow to join the editorial board of the Hebrew-language newspaper Ha-Tsefirah, in Warsaw, where he began to publish his poems and stories, as well as literary criticism and translations. His first book, Zilelei ha-Hayyim (The Shadows of Life), a collection of stories and sketches, was published in 1904.

In 1906, he co-founded the Hebrew-language publishing house "Nisyonot" (Attempts), and after moving to London in 1907, he co-edited (with Brenner) Ha'Meorer, a Hebrew periodical.

In the fall of 1907, he immigrated to Palestine; however, his experience there disappointed him, and in 1908 he returned to Russia. In 1913, he died in Warsaw of a heart attack.

Gnessin wrote in a unique style of prose that was notable for its expressionistic language form. Many Israeli literary scholars, such as Dan Miron and Gershon Shaked have written of his work, especially about the short story "BaGanim" (At the Gardens).

== Published works ==
- Collected Works (two volumes), Tel-Aviv: Hakibbutz Hameuchad and Zemorah-Bitan, 1982 [Hebrew]
- Beside & Other Stories, with an introduction by Rachel Albeck-Gidron, New Milford: Toby Press, c2005.
