= Lipsker =

Lipsker (also Lipskar, Lipskier) is a Yiddish surname. Notable people with the surname include:

- Avidov Lipsker (born 1949), Israeli professor of Hebrew Literature
- Ludwig Lipsker (1921–2010), German Jewish businessman, member of the board of directors of the Central Council of Jews in Germany
- Sholom Lipskar (1946–2025), American Orthodox rabbi and community leader

== See also ==
- Lipskerov
