= Rachel Albeck-Gidron =

Israeli inter-disciplinary researcher

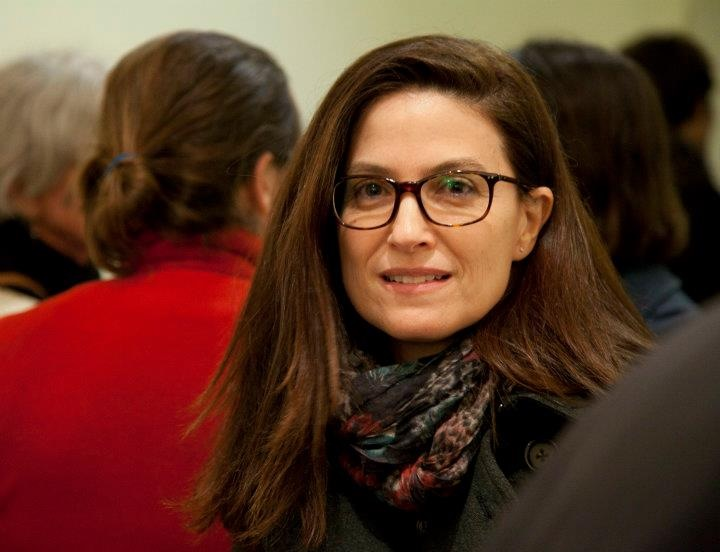
Rachel Albeck-Gidron

Rachel Albeck-Gidron (Hebrew: רחל אלבק-גדרון) is a literature scholar and associate Professor in the Faculty of Jewish Studies at Bar-Ilan University. She has explored three chief subjects: 1. Interdisciplinary research integrating comparative literature, visual arts, and philosophy based on Leibniz’s Monadology theory; 2. Modern Hebrew literature starting in 1900 and; 3. Comparative probing of the Far East vis the Occident culture in literature, aesthetics, and philosophy, mainly in Yoel Hoffmann's works. 4. Textology; Theory of literary text’s genealogy; 5. Modern aspects of Ashkenazi pronunciation and rhythm in Modern Hebrew Literature.

== Biography ==
Rachel Albeck-Gidron is the daughter of Shalom Albeck, a Mishpat Ivri professor at Bar-Ilan University, and Plia Albeck, head of the civil department at State Attorney. Her grandfather from her mother's side was Israel's second State Comptroller, Yitzhak Nebenzahl, Her grandfather, the Talmud scholar Hanoch Albeck, was from her father's side. She was raised in the Jewish Quarter, Old City of Jerusalem, and has two brothers and two sisters. She served in National Civil Service.

Albeck-Gidron earned an MA at Bar-Ilan University and submitted her MA thesis in 1985 titled “The Monadology of Leibniz and the Existentialism of Sartre as a basis for a study of the works Nausea, No Exit, and The Reprieve." She received her PhD from Bar-Ilan University in 1998 with highest distinction under the supervision of Prof. Ruth Reichelberg. Her Dissertation titled: “Leibniz's Theory of the Monads as a poetic model for modern literature in the twentieth century.” 2006–2007, she was an associate visiting professor at the Taube Center for Jewish Studies, Stanford University. In 2012, she was a Research Fellow at the Graduate School of Letters at Osaka University, Japan. In 2017, she was a Visiting Scholar at the philosophy faculty at the Institute of Jewish and Religions Studies at the University of Potsdam, Germany. In 2017, she won the S. Yizhar Award for her Monography: “Exploring the Third Option: A Critical Study of Yoel Hoffmann's Works,” published by Ben-Gurion University of the Negev Publications in 2016. In 2019/20, she won a scholarship from the Israel Science Foundation for the Critical edition of Uri Zvi Greenberg's 'Masekhet Ha-Matkonet Ve-Ha-Dmut': a Study of the Work's Genesis Through Earlier Manuscript Drafts and Printing. In 2020/21, she won a grant from the Israel Science Foundation for book publishing about Shamanism and literacy criticism, published by Magnes Press in 2021.

She was the head of the literature committee at Sal Tarbut Artzi, which selects culture shows and artist lecturers for Israeli schools, a joint educational program for the Ministry of Education (Israel), the Israeli Association of Community Centers, and the Local government in Israel. She is a member of the editorial boards of Mikan, Journal for Literary Studies; Ben-Gurion University of the Negev; Alpayim Ve'Od: Rethinking Culture in Israel; Parshanut Ve-Tarbut - Sidra Chadasha, A Series, Carmel Publishing House; and Sifrut Ivrit Avar-Hove Parshanut Ve-Tarbut, A Series, Carmel Publishing House. She serves as an editor of special issues in the journals Criticism and Interpretation and Zeitschrift der Vereinigung für Jüdische Studien. During the year 2026, she was a visiting scholar at the Faculty of Languages, Cultures and Societies, University of Lille, France.

Rachel Albeck-Gidron is married to Avidov Lipsker, a professor of Hebrew literature at Bar Ilan University, and has two children.

== Her work ==
=== The century of the monads: Leibniz's metaphysics and 20th-century modernity ===
The book's thesis is that Leibniz’s Monadology theory is the benchmark for fundamental patterns in modernistic thought. The author demonstrates this claim in the Stream of Consciousness novel and the major movements of plastic art in the late 19th century and the beginning of the 20th century. She contends that modern philosophy and Leibniz's Monadology have standard features: decentralization, pessimism, and relativity.

=== Exploring the Third Option: A Critical Study of Yoel Hoffmann's Works ===
Albeck-Gidron examined several facets and the internal and genre progress in Hoffman's literary corpus: The Holocaust, the feminine identity, and the dominance of Jewish, Hebrew, and Israeli subjects in his writings, his attitude toward the Western philosophy, the Buddhist philosophy in his writings, humor and nonsense, the text typography and its installment, photography, and illustration in his writings. Literature critic Hanna Hertzig wrote in an article review in Haaretz: "The author does almost the impossible by academically explaining Hoffman's compilation… she succeeds in writing "Hoffmanese" without neglecting the rationality and analytic indoctrination obliged by the scientific discipline. She also uses vast knowledge from various philosophy, literature, and cultural methods that characterize "Hoffmann's homeland" in illuminating contexts.” Sapir Prize winner Reuven Namdar wrote in an article in Moznaim journal that harmony between content and description is a romantic longing since the dawn of literature and aesthetic, seldom found, and rise into its apotheosis in Yoel Hoffmann’s writings… such equivalent compatibility coexist in Albeck-Gidron’s book.” It was one of the ten best Hebrew books in 2016 by Israel Hayom.

=== Shamanism and literary criticism ===
Albeck-Gidron argues that Cartesianism philosophy, one of the touchstones of the Enlightenment, decouples the mind from the body and considers perceptions and sensations illusions. This philosophy causes the European person to experience his surroundings as futile. Therefore, a poet cannot describe the natural world as a living embodiment. On the other hand, Eastern philosophy acknowledges animism; accordingly, the Haiku and Tanka poetries consist of correspondence between the human soul and nature. This divergence between the Eastern and Western philosophies leads Albeck-Gidron to refer to literary criticism as a Shamanism praxis. She deems the Shaman as a fragile outsider, shunned. However, at times of crisis, the community seeks his help for redemption, which he carries out by bridging the abyss between society and its surrounding nature due to his idiosyncratic sensitivity. The author advocates reckoning the writer as a shaman by rendering their reader's attentive observation, which progeny genuine comprehension, and unfolding the concealed reality in the shredded chaotic world to repair it. The book analyzes works by A. B. Yehoshua, Aharon Appelfeld, Simon Halkin, Orly Castel-Bloom, Ronit Matalon, Dahlia Ravikovitch, Ana Herman, Micha Josef Berdyczewski, and Uri Nissan Gnessin. Israel Hayom chose it as one of the best books of 2021.

== Bibliography ==
=== Books author ===
- Century of the Mondas: Leibniz's metaphysics and 20th-century modernity. Ramat Gan: Ramat Gan, Bar-Ilan University Press, 2007. (Hebrew)
- Exploring the Third Option: A Critical Study of Yoel Hoffmann's Works. Or Yehuda: Dvir Publishing House and Heksherim Institute, Ben-Gurion University of the Negev, 2016. (Hebrew)
- Shamanism and literary criticism. Jerusalem: Magnes Press, 2021. (Hebrew)
- Beside & other stories / Uri Nissan Gnessin with an introduction by Rachel Albeck-Gidron. London : Toby Press, 2005.

=== Books editor ===
- Rachel Albeck-Gidron, Shlomy Mualem (ed.) Aesthetics, poetics, and new readings. Criticism and interpretation, 0084-9456 no. 42. Ramat Gan: Bar-Ilan University Press, 2010. (Hebrew)
- Nathanael Riemer; Rachel Gidron-Albeck; Markus Krah (eds.). JewBus, Jewish Hindus & other Jewish Encounters with East Asian Religions. Potsdam: University of Potsdam, 2018.
