= Siegfried Moses =

German-Israeli politician (1887–1974)

- זיגפריד מוזס
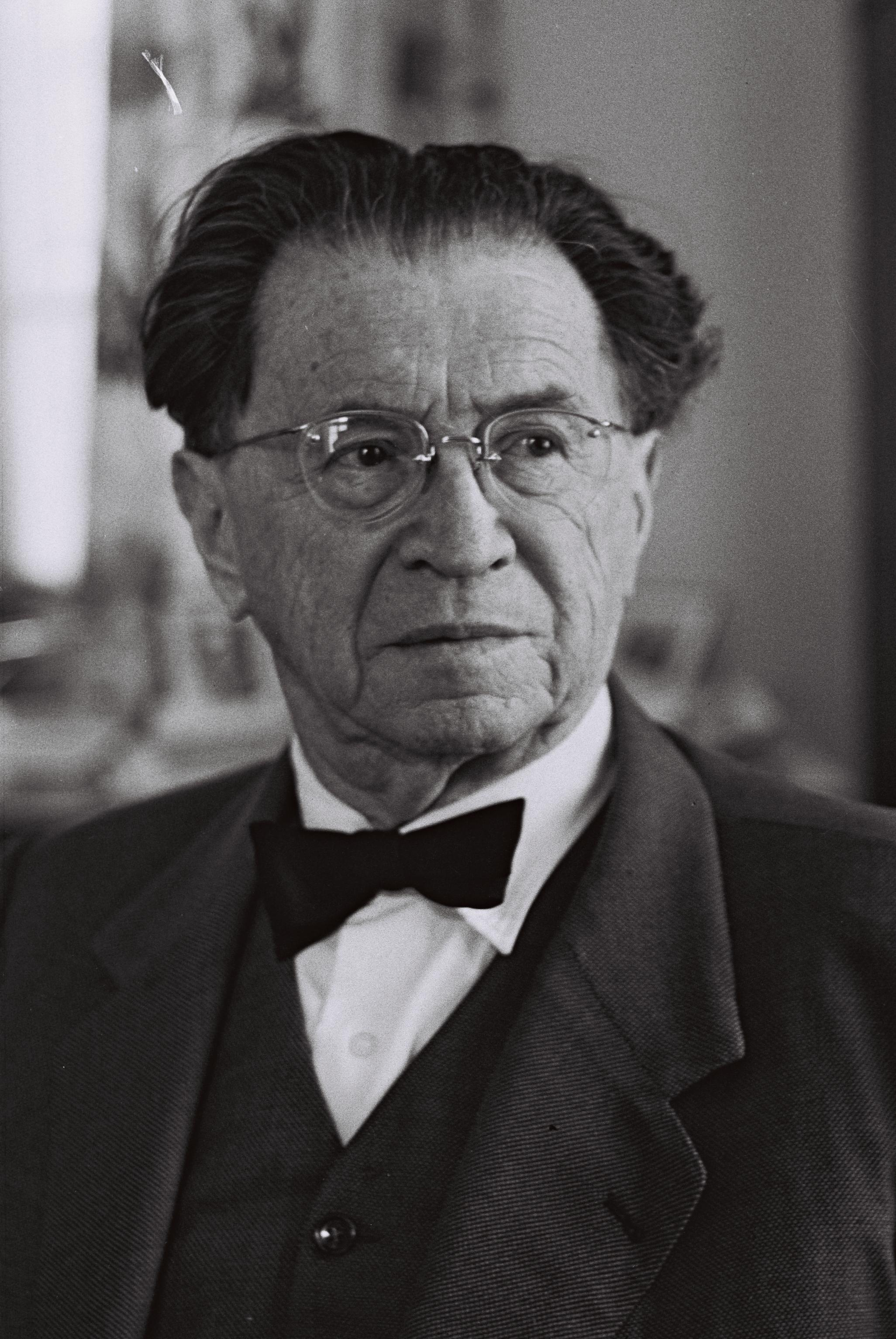
- Moses in 1960

State Comptroller of Israel
- In office 1949–1961
- Succeeded by: Yitzhak Nebenzahl

Personal details
- Born: 3 May 1887; Prussia
- Died: 15 January 1974 (aged 86); Tel Aviv, Israel

Siegfried Moses (Hebrew: זיגפריד מוזס; 3 May 1887 – 15 January 1974) was a German-Israeli politician.

== Biography ==
Moses was born on 3 May 1887 in Prussia.

Moses died on 15 January 1974 in Tel Aviv, Israel.
