= Chizkiyahu Nebenzahl =

Israeli rabbi

Chizkiyahu Nebenzahl (Hebrew: חזקיהו נבנצל) is the current Rabbi of the Old City of Jerusalem.

Nebenzahl is the youngest son of Rabbi Avigdor Nebenzahl, the previous Rabbi of the Old City. He also serves on the faculty of Yeshivat Netiv Aryeh.

Nebenzahl is also the head of Kollel Kotel, which he started at the direction of Rabbi Chaim Kanievsky. Kollel Kotel has approximately 700 elite scholars studying under the tutelage of Nebenzahl.
