= Starodub =

Town in Bryansk Oblast, Russia

Starodub Стародуб
- Town
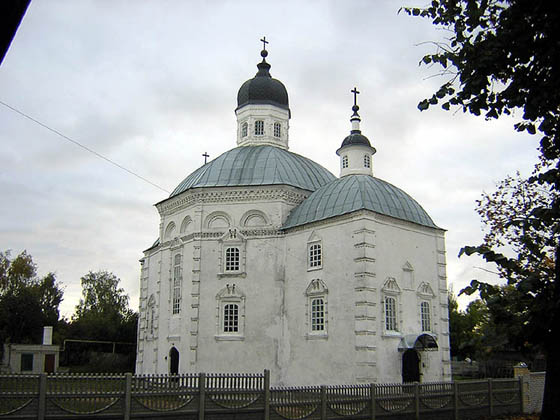
- Cathedral of the Nativity of Christ

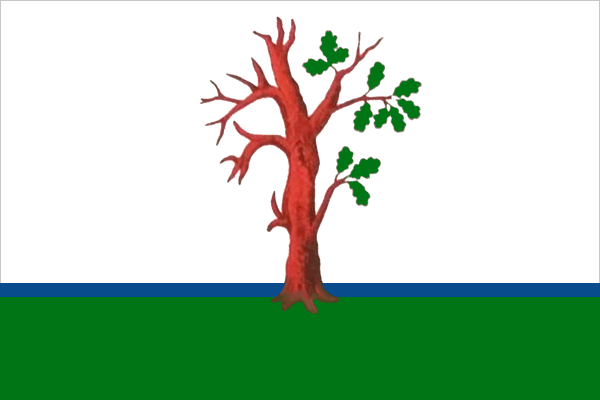
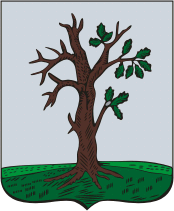
- Flag Coat of arms
- Interactive map of Starodub
- Location of Starodub Starodub (Bryansk Oblast)
- Coordinates: 52°35′N 32°46′E
- Country: Russia
- Federal subject: Bryansk Oblast
- Known since: 11th century
- Elevation: 180 m (590 ft)

Population (2010 Census)
  - Total: 19,010
  - Estimate (2021): 17,687 (−7%)

Administrative status
  - Subordinated to: Starodubsky Urban Administrative Okrug (town of oblast significance)
  - Capital of: Starodubsky Urban Administrative Okrug, Starodubsky District

Municipal status
  - Urban okrug: Starodub Urban Okrug
  - Capital of: Starodub Urban Okrug
- Time zone: UTC+3 (MSK)
- Postal code: 142943
- OKTMO ID: 15750000001

Starodub (Russian: Староду́б, IPA: [stərɐˈdup]; Ukrainian: Староду́б, IPA: [ˌstɐroˈdub]; lit. 'old oak') is a town in Bryansk Oblast, Russia, on the Babinets River in the Dnieper basin, 169 kilometers (105 mi) southwest of Bryansk. Population: 17,687 (2021 census); 19,010 (2010 census); 18,643 (2002 census); 18,906 (1989 Soviet census); 16,000 (1975).

== History ==
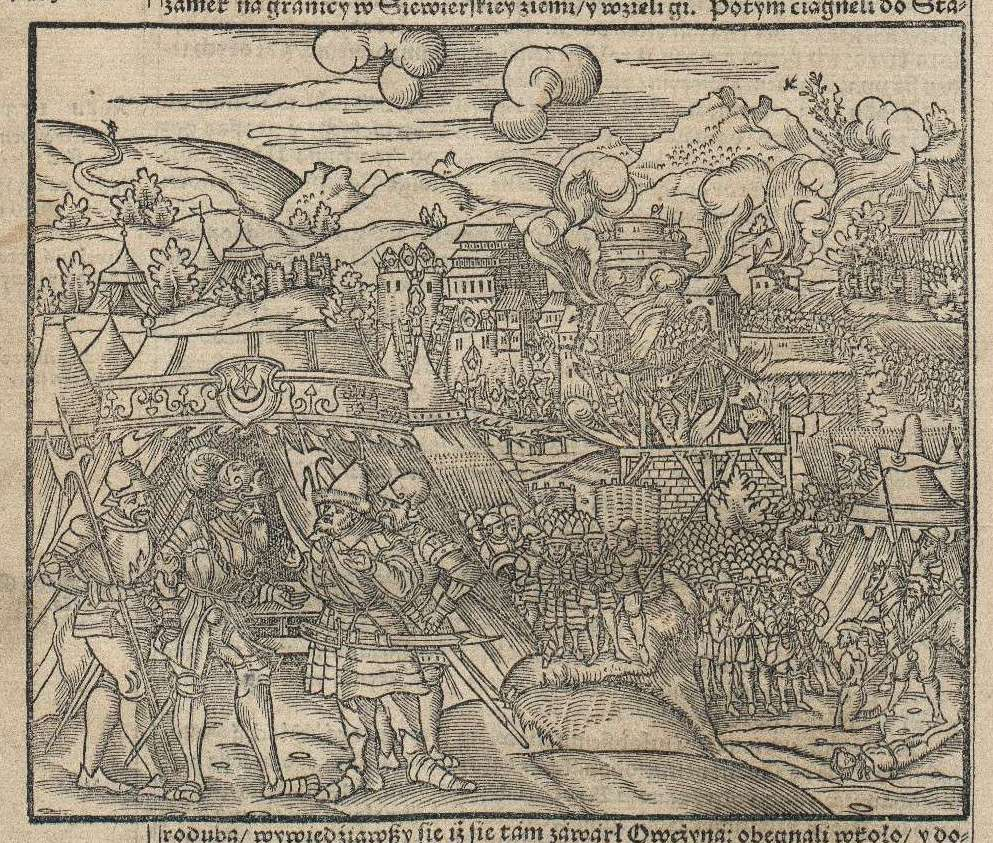
Siege of Starodub in 1535 by Polish-Lithuanian forces

Starodub has been known since the 11th century, when it was a part of the Principality of Chernigov. It was plundered by the Cumans in 1080. It was burned to the ground by the Mongols in the 13th century.

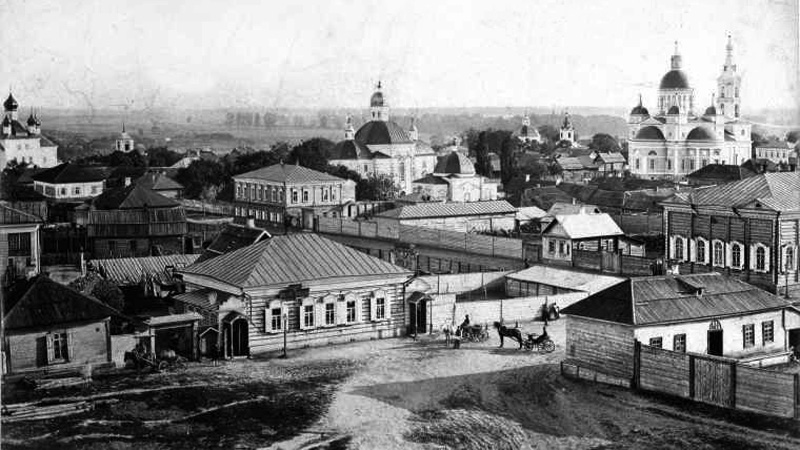
Starodub in the late 19th century.

It became a part of the Grand Duchy of Lithuania in the 14th century (soon part of the Polish–Lithuanian union), and Grand Duke Algirdas rebuilt it as a defensive stronghold against Muscovites and Tatars. In 1408, it was granted to Duke Švitrigaila. In 1503, it passed to the Grand Duchy of Moscow. In 1535, it was besieged and captured by Polish-Lithuanian forces and the defenders were executed however, it soon fell back to Muscovy. In 1616, it was recaptured by the Polish–Lithuanian Commonwealth, within which it became a county seat in the Smolensk Voivodeship. During the Smolensk War, in 1632, it was captured by Russia, however, it was restored to the Polish–Lithuanian Commonwealth in 1634. In 1648, during the Khmelnytskyi Uprising, Zaporozhian Cossacks seized the town, and 188 families of local Ruthenian nobility recognized the Cossack hetman as a new governor, within the Polish–Lithuanian Commonwealth, after which Khmelnytskyi's Cossacks staged an anti-Jewish pogrom. In 1654, it passed to Russia, confirmed in 1686. In 1660, the town was ravaged by Tatars, and in 1663 it was attacked by the Poles. Starodub became the center of Starodub Cossack Regiment and enjoyed a large measure of autonomy between 1666 and 1686. In 1677 the town suffered a fire.

Starodub retained rudiments of Cossack Hetmanate's administrative division until 1782 when it became an uyezd town. In 1796, Starodub was incorporated into Chernigov Governorate. In 1867, Starodub had a population of 12,042. In 1870, there were ten factories, including nine tanneries. Four annual fairs were held. In 1918, the town was occupied by the Germans and the town was part of the Ukrainian People's Republic. The Soviet authority was instated in November 1918.

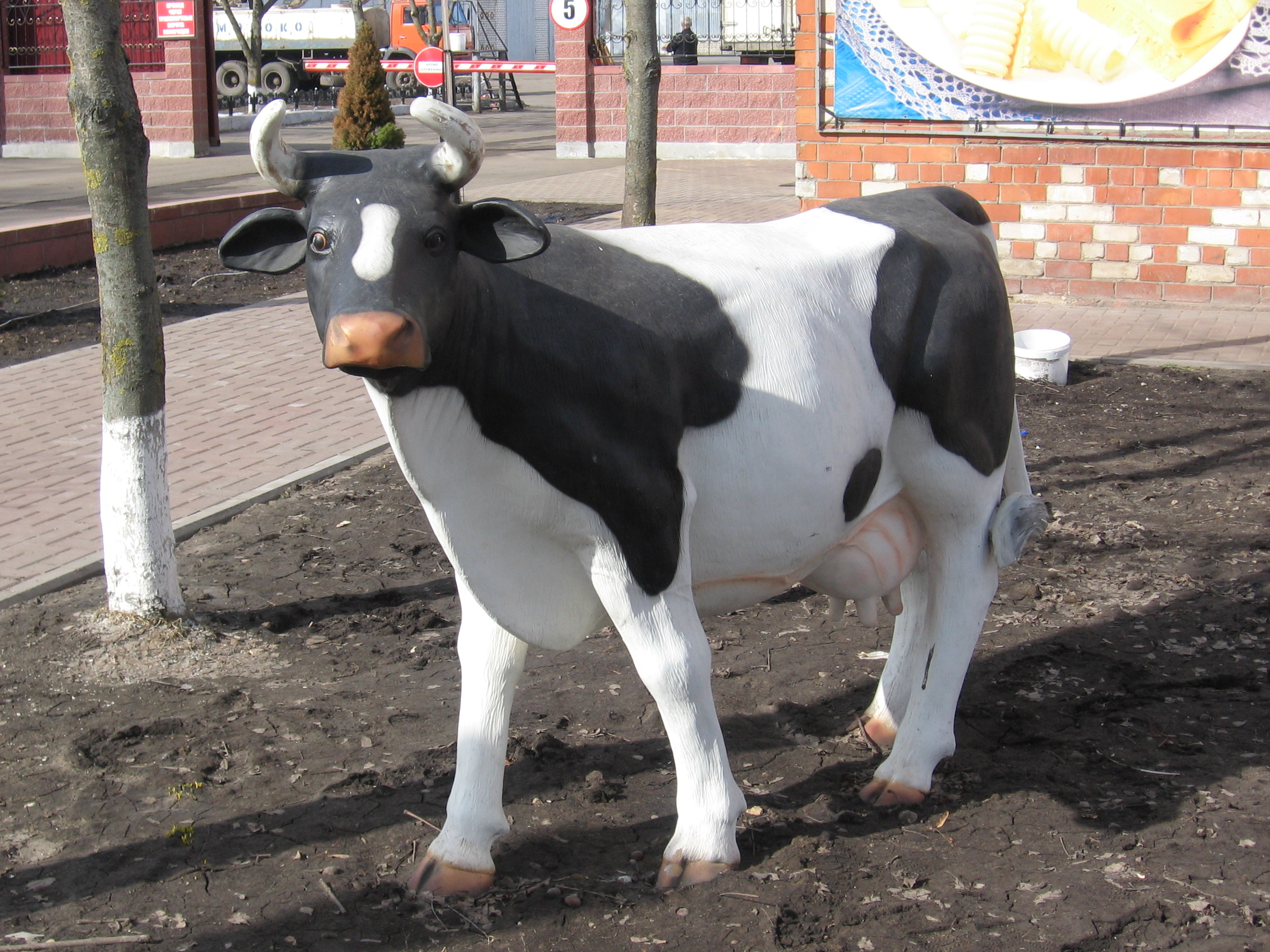
Statue of a cow in front of the Starodub cheese factory

During the Soviet period, Starodub was a part of Gomel Governorate (1919–1926), Bryansk Governorate (1926–1929), Western Oblast (1929–1937), and Oryol Oblast (1937–1944). The town was once again occupied by the Germans between August 18, 1941 and September 22, 1943. The Germans operated a Nazi prison and a forced labour battalion for Jews in the town. Starodub finally became a part of Bryansk Oblast in 1944.

== Administrative and municipal status ==
Within the framework of administrative divisions, Starodub serves as the administrative center of Starodubsky District, even though it is not a part of it. As an administrative division, it is incorporated separately as Starodubsky Urban Administrative Okrug—an administrative unit with the status equal to that of the districts. As a municipal division, Starodubsky Urban Administrative Okrug is incorporated as Starodub Urban Okrug.

Prior to January 1, 2013, Starodub was administratively incorporated as a town of district significance within Starodubsky District.

== Architecture ==
As a significant center of the Cossack Hetmanate, Starodub is the only place in Russia where authentic examples of Ukrainian Baroque may be seen. The Nativity Cathedral, built in 1617 and overhauled after a conflagration in 1677, is a typical example of Cossack Baroque. The Epiphany Church goes back to 1789, while the Church of St. Nicholas was erected in the Neoclassical style in 1802.

== Notable people ==
- Alexandra Ramm-Pfemfert (1883–1963), translator
- Uri Nissan Gnessin (1879–1913), writer
- Menahem Gnessin (1882–1951), actor
- Iosif Vorovich (1920-2001), mathematician
- Pavlo Skoropadskyi (1873–1945), Hetman of Ukraine, went to school in Starodub
- Ivan Skoropadskyi (1646–1722), Zaporizhian Hetman, was at one point stationed in the town, when he was colonel of the Starodub Cossack regiment

== See also ==
- Bibliography of Russian history
