= Iosif Vorovich =

Russian mathematician (1920–2001)

- Born: Iosif Izrailevich-Girshevich Vorovich; June 21, 1920; Starodub, Gomel Governorate
- Died: September 6, 2001 (aged 81); Rostov-on-Don, Russia
- Education: Doctor of Sciences (1958); Academician of the Russian Academy of Sciences
- Alma mater: Moscow State University (1941), Zhukovsky Air Force Engineering Academy
- Scientific career
- Fields: Mathematics

Iosif Izrailevich-Girshevich Vorovich (born 21 June 1920, died 6 September 2001) was a Soviet and Russian mathematician, scientific engineer, author and was made a member of the Russian Academy of Sciences in 1970. He was a specialist in continuum mechanics and the theory of elasticity. He was born in the city of Starodub, Gomel Governorate.

Vorovich attended Moscow State University to study mathematics where he achieved outstanding levels in his first year. He later became one of a group of specialists who were able to achieve a crossover between mechanical engineering and mathematics, expressing and posing mechanical problems in mathematical form, solving the problems mathematically and still maintaining an engineer’s understanding of the results.

Vorovich graduated from the Zhukovsky Air Force Engineering Academy in 1944. His main works deal with mathematical problems of continuum mechanics, the nonlinear theory of shells, problems of stress concentration and thick plates, and mixed problems in the theory of elasticity about which he wrote or co-authored several books. He was awarded the Order of the Badge of Honour.

In 1971, Vorovich founded the Research Institute of Mechanics and Applied Mathematics at Rostov State University, Rostov-on-Don, now part of the Southern Federal University, Russia.

== Selected bibliography ==
The Nonlinear Theory of Shallow Shells Dynamics. 1998, ISBN 0-387-98339-2 (English translation.) First published in Russian in 1989.
