= Lipskerov =

Lipskerov (feminine: Lipskerova) is a Russian Jewish surname derived from the Yiddish surname Lipsker. Notable people with the surname include:

- Dmitri Lipskerov (born 1964), Russian Jewish writer and dramatist
- Mikhail Lipskerov (born 1939) Russian Jewish screenwriter, writer and playwright
