= Yitzhak Nebenzahl =

State Comptroller of Israel (1907–1992)

- יצחק ארנסט נֶבֶּנְצָל
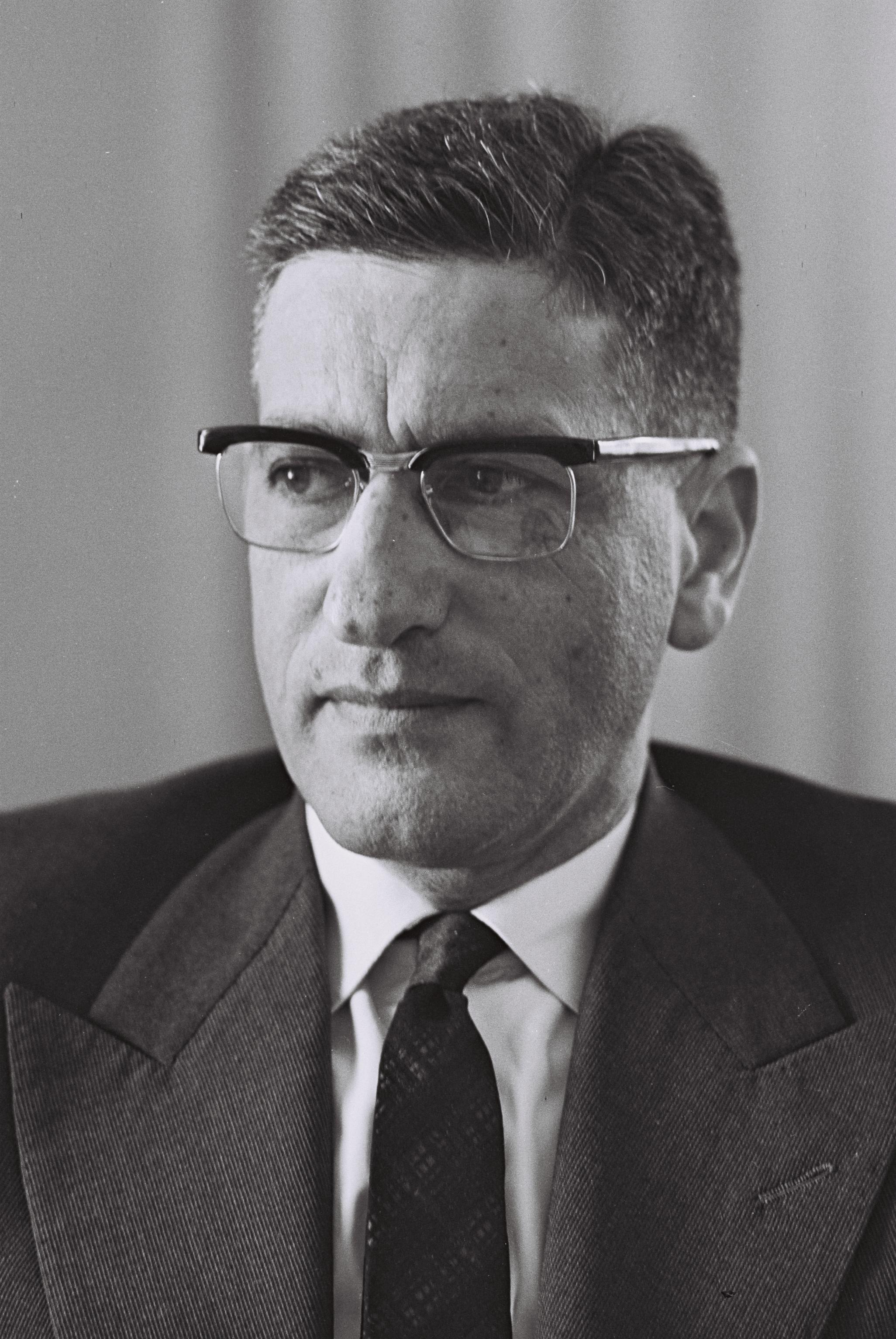
- Nebenzahl in November 1962

State Comptroller of Israel
- In office 1961–1981
- Preceded by: Siegfried Moses
- Succeeded by: Yitzhak Tunik

Personal details
- Born: Yitzhak Ernst Nebenzahl; 24 October 1907 Frankfurt, Germany
- Died: 19 December 1992 (aged 85)
- Education: University of Frankfurt

Yitzhak Ernst Nebenzahl (Hebrew: יצחק ארנסט נֶבֶּנְצָל; 14 October 1907–19 December 1992) was appointed State Comptroller of the State of Israel in 1961 by President Yitzchak Ben Zvi. From 1971 he served as both State Comptroller and Ombudsman from 1961–1981.

== Biography ==
He was born in Frankfurt on 24 October 1907 to Beila and Akiva Yehuda HaLevi Nebenzahl. He received his Ph.D. in Law from Frankfurt University in 1929 and worked primarily in civil law at universities in at Berlin and Freiburg.

Nebenzahl immigrated to Mandate Palestine in 1933 and settled in Jerusalem.

Nebenzahl and his wife Hildegard had four children. His son, Avigdor Nebenzahl, was the Chief Rabbi of the Old City of Jerusalem, and his daughter Plia Albeck, served as legal adviser to the Israeli Government for most of her professional career. His granddaughter, Rachel Albeck-Gidron, is a Professor in the Faculty of Jewish Studies at Bar-Ilan University.

== Professional career ==
Nebenzahl was the legal advisor for Yefet Bank (later known as Israel-American Bank and then part of Bank Hapoalim) from 1933-1946. He also served as a director of several organizations: from 1947-1961 he served as chairman of the Board of Directors of Hollander and Co, from 1948-1950 he was director of the Jerusalem Development Division of the Jewish Agency, of Jerusalem Economy Ltd from 1948-1961, and several other companies and advisory councils, among them Bank of Israel and the Postal Bank. until he was appointed as State Controller.

In 1973 he was appointed to the Agranat Commission into the Yom Kippur War.

Nebenzahl died on 19 December 1992 following a long period of illness.
