= Yeshivat Netiv Aryeh =

Coordinates: 31.77686°N 35.23310°E

Yeshivat Netiv Aryeh (in Hebrew: ישיבת נתיב אריה) is a Religious Zionist yeshiva located at the Western Wall Plaza in the Old City of Jerusalem.

Netiv Aryeh was founded in 2003 by the current rosh yeshiva, Aharon Bina. Avigdor Nebenzahl, former chief rabbi of the Old City of Jerusalem, is the senior rosh yeshiva. His son Chizkiyahu Nebenzahl, the current chief rabbi, also serves as a rosh yeshiva.

== History ==
The yeshiva is named after Bina's father, Aryeh Bina. It occupies a building that formerly housed the yeshiva of Shlomo Goren.

The yeshiva opened in September 2003 following a split in the leadership within Yeshivat HaKotel and started with over 200 students. The majority of students are post high school, English-speaking students from the United States, with some students from England and Canada.

Students at the yeshiva study a curriculum consisting of Talmud, Nach, Halacha, Jewish Philosophy, Zionism, and Hassidut.

== Controversy ==
Allegations of abuse have been levelled at the yeshiva. Bina has been alleged to "regularly yell at, humiliate and insult students in public; threaten to expel them for seemingly no reason; press psychologists he hires to share private information about the students he has sent them; and tell those in disfavor that they are cursed." He has been accused of regularly calling students shaygetz (Yiddish slur meaning "Gentile"), "gay", "fat", "alcoholic", that they would get infected with AIDS or get divorced. Bina's supporters maintain that these are merely symptoms of what is commonly referred to as his 'tough love', and that these behaviors are ultimately beneficial to the students, especially the ones who were inconsistent with their classroom attendance.

== Notable alumni ==
- Mordechai Shapiro, American entertainer

== Bibliography ==
- Yeshivat Netiv Aryeh at the Kotel: In honor of Yitzchak Leib and Ruth Rennert: The overseas program. Yeshivat Netiv Aryeh. 2006.
