= Menahem Gnessin =

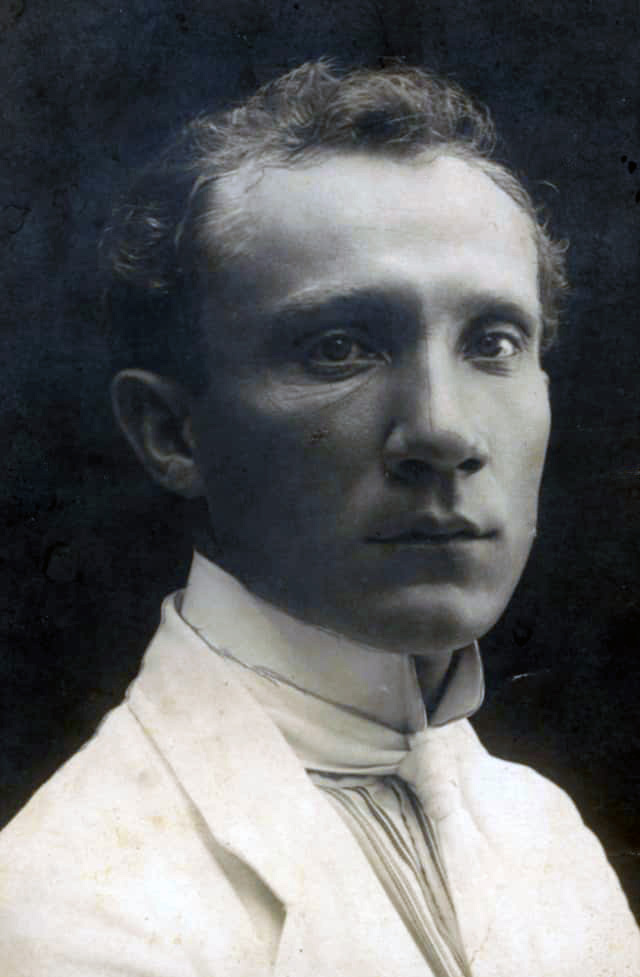
Menahem Natanovich Gnessin

Menahem Natanovich Gnessin (Russian: Мена́хем Ната́нович Гне́син; Hebrew: מנחם גנסין; 1882–1951) was an early Russian Jewish actor and Hebrew language instructor who created the Amateur Dramatic Arts Company in 1907 for presentation of plays in Hebrew. In 1917, at Moscow he also helped start Habimah, the world's first professional Hebrew theater. He is best known as an actor in the 1933 drama, Oded the Wanderer. Gnessin wrote articles about his time in the theater, and published memoirs titled Darki im ha-Te'atron ha-Ivri, 1905–26 (My Career in the Hebrew Theater, 1946).

Born in Starodub, he emigrated to Palestine, where he died in 1951.
