= Avidov Lipsker =

- אבידב ליפסקר
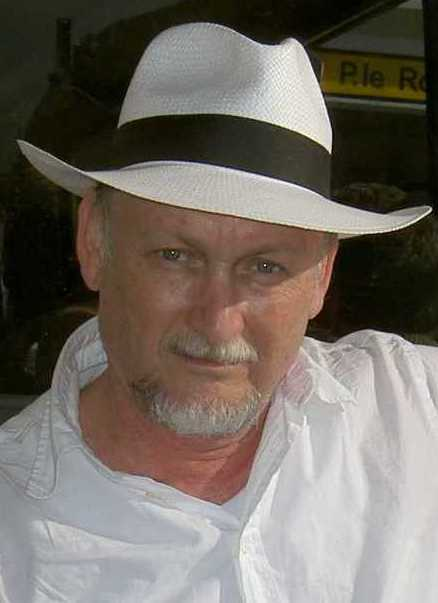
- Born: 1949 (age 76–77)

Avidov Lipsker (Hebrew: אבידב ליפסקר; born 1949) is an Israeli professor of Hebrew Literature at Bar Ilan University in Israel.

== Biography ==
Avidov Lipsker was born in Haifa in 1949. His fields of study are the Hebrew Literature of the Third and Fourth Immigration (Aliyah), as well as ancient and modern Hebrew prose. From 1998–2002, Lipsker was the chair of the Department of Literature of the Jewish People and as the chair of the Kurzweil Institute. Since 2007 he was the chair of the Inter-Disciplinary Academic Programs in Bar-Ilan University (Cognitive Studies, Interpretation and Culture, Gender Studies, Science and Society and Conflict Resolution). Since 2007 Lipsker is a senior researcher in Shalom Hartman Institute – Jerusalem.

From the early 2000s, Lipsker has held the position of chief editor of the research periodical – Criticism and Interpretation (Bar-Ilan University Press). From 1998–2004 held the position of chief editor at Tsafon, a periodical of Haifa's Writer's Association. He has published dozens of articles and encyclopedic entries (both in Hebrew and English) about Modern Hebrew prose and poetry, as well as studies in the history of the ancient Hebrew narrative. Lipsker is a chief editor of the Thema series and, a series of publications Uri Zvi Grinberg's Poetry – Researches and Documents at Bar-Ilan University. He has also published several stories and a book of poetry.

He is married to Rachel Albeck-Gidron, a professor of Hebrew Literature at Bar-Ilan University.

== Fields of research ==
=== Modern Hebrew poetry ===
In his monographic studies, Lipsker intentionally dealt with "marginal" poets, out of a new historiographic perspective, according to which the "average taste" and, at times even the graphomanic writings, represent the style-bar and literary taste from which the contemporary poetic styles can be evaluated and measured. The monographs on the poetry of Shin Shalom, Yitzhak Ogen and Avraham Broides depict the manner in which esthetic and poetic practices standpoints were imported from Europe to Eretz Yisrael—mainly symbolism and expressionism. These studies also address sociological questions of affinity to a social and cultural context. This study is supported by a study of letters and diaries (Yitzhak Lamdan's Collected Letters, as well as his diary which is being prepared for publishing).

=== Ecological discourse on literature ===
Lipsker has developed a historiographic model which he named "Ecology of Literature". This model refers to literary texts as items within a widespread cultural system – not necessarily textual, but also plastic-visual and cultural climate.

In His book The Poetry of Yitzhak Ogen (Magness Publish House), he has published his programmatic study on his ecological historiography (which opposes the totality of the "Literary Republic" discourse). "The Ecological Discourse on Literature" seeks to describe the literary skill of the author as an "ecological niche", meaning as a form of aptness fitted uniquely to the cultural conditions in which he formulates his literary work. This discourse deals with questions of changing style and preference, in evolutionary terms while, systematically deconstructing the generalizing narratives on literary revolutions and rebellions. Lipsker's studies in this field deal mainly with the connection between visual designs of literary text, artistic and literary styles and material culture.

=== Thematology of the literature of the Jewish people ===
This research was carried out through two research grants from the Germany-Israel Foundation (G.I.F.). In 1985, Lipsker joined Prof. Yoav Elstein—founder of the Encyclopedia of the Jewish Story—with whom he has shaped the research methodology Thematology of Jewish Narrative. Since the foundation of the Encyclopedia, he has served as its chief editor. Since 2007, has been the director of the Encyclopedia of the Jewish Story: Sippur Okev Sippur (Bar-Ilan University Press). This field of study addresses the phenomenon of the multi-version appearance of the Jewish story in the Hebrew, Aramaic, Yiddish, Ladino and Judeo-Arabic languages. The Encyclopedia holds an archive of hundreds of versions of Jewish stories both in print and manuscripts. The first volume of the Encyclopedia was published in 2005, the second volume in 2009, the third volume in 2013, and the fourth one in 2018. Each volume contains Encyclopedic entries reflecting the unfolding of the different versions of a certain story, from post-biblical era to the 20th century. The first volume presents the method with which the stories are mapped, as well as the manner in which a multi-version story is handled as a homogenous phenomenon, undergoing changes through time and different cultural spaces. The Encyclopedia's editorial board gives a constant platform for academic publication in the Thema series, which includes comprehensive monographs on Jewish fiction, as well as a collection of studies called Ma'ase Sippur: Studies in Jewish Narrative.

== Published works ==
=== As author ===
- The Poetry of Shin Shalom (1922–1941), Ha'Poalim Publish House, Tel Aviv 1992.
- Selected Letters of Yizhak Lamdan, Gnazim Institute and Israel Matz Foundation, New York and Tel Aviv 1998.
- Born Unto Trouble: The Poetry of Abraham Broides (1919–1974), The Haifa University Press, Ben-Gurion University Press, Haifa and Beer-Sheba 2000.
- The Poetry of Yitzhak Ogen: Literary Ecosystem in Eretz Yisrael 1930–1940, The Hebrew University Magnes Press, Jerusalem 2006.
- Red Poem Blue Poem: Seven Essays on Uri Zvi Grinberg and Two Essays on Else Lasker-Schüler (in Hebrew). Ramat Gan: Bar Ilan University Press. 2010. ISBN 978-9652263933.
- Yizhak Lamdan's Diary: Annotated Critical Edition, Volume I, Bar-Ilan University Press, Ramat-Gan 2015.
- Reflections on S. Y. Agnon, Volume I, Bar-Ilan University Press, Ramat-Gan 2015.
- Reflections on S. Y. Agnon, Volume II, Bar-Ilan University Press, Ramat-Gan 2018.
- The Ecology of Literature, Bar-Ilan University Press, Ramat-Gan 2019.
- The Ecology of Literature Environments, Carmel Publishing House, Jerusalem 2022.
- Reflections on S. Y. Agnon, Volume III, Bar-Ilan University Press, Ramat-Gan 2024.

=== As editor ===
- Nili Sadan, Prose of the Twenties in Eretz Yisrael, Hebrew: Poalim Library Press, 1991.
- Nili Sadan, Aharon Reuveni : Monography, Hebrew: Poalim Library Press, 1994.
- Gideon Katzanelson, Essays on Uri Zvi Grinberg's Poetry, Hebrew: Yaron Golan Press, Tel Aviv, 1993.
- Encyclopedia of the Jewish Story: Sippur Okev Sippur, Vol I–IV, Hebrew: Bar-Ilan University Press, Ramat Gan 2005–2018 (Vols. I-II with Yoav Elstein and Rella Kushelevsky, Vol. III with Yoav Elstein).
- Ma'aseh Sippur: Studies in the Jewish Narrative, Vol I–IV, Hebrew: Bar-Ilan University, Ramat Gan 2006–2018 (Vols. I-III with Rella Kushelevsky).
- Rechovot ha-Nahar by Uri Zvi Grinberg: Studies and Documents, Hebrew: Bar-Ilan University Press, Ramat-Gan, 2007.

=== Festschrift ===
- Reflections on Booklore: Studies Presented to Prof. Avidov Lipsker, Eds.: Yigal Schwartz, Lilach Nethanel, Claudia Rosenzweig-Kupfer, and Rona Tausinger, Hebrew: Bar-Ilan University Press, Ramat-Gan 2020.
