= Yosef Shapira (judge) =

Israeli attorney and former judge (born 1945)

Yosef Haim Shapira
- יוסף חיים שפירא
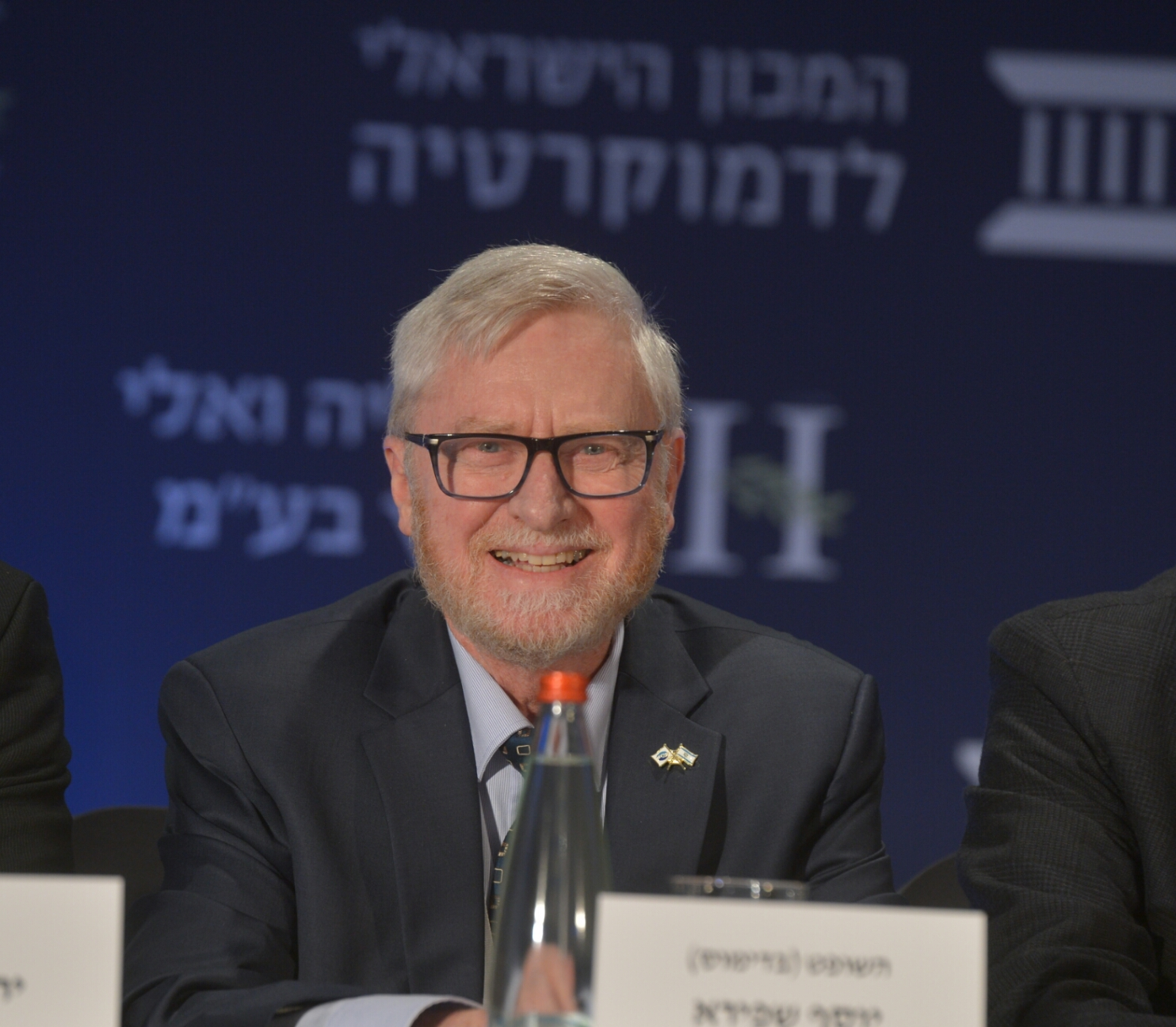

State Comptroller of Israel
- In office July 2012 – July 2019
- Preceded by: Micha Lindenstrauss
- Succeeded by: Matanyahu Englman

Personal details
- Born: 5 July 1945 (age 80) Jerusalem, Mandatory Palestine
- Children: 3
- Education: Hebrew University of Jerusalem (LL.B.) University of Leicester (M.A. in Criminology)
- Profession: Attorney, judge

Yosef Haim Shapira (Hebrew: יוסף חיים שפירא; born 5 July 1945) is an Israeli attorney and judge who served as the seventh State Comptroller of Israel from July 2012 to July 2019.

== Biography ==
Shapira was born in Jerusalem. He earned a law degree at the Hebrew University of Jerusalem in 1971 and in 1972 was certified as a lawyer. As part of his reserve duty, he served as a judge at the IDF's Military Court of Appeals, as a colonel. In 2000 he received a Master's degree in criminology from the University of Leicester in England.

Shapira is married and a father of three children and two grandchildren.

== Judicial career ==
Between 2001–2003 he was Vice Chairman of the National Disciplinary Tribunal of the Israeli Bar Association. In July 2003 he was appointed a judge of HaShalom courts in the District of Jerusalem. In May 2005 he was appointed a judge of the District Court of Jerusalem.

Notable rulings include the opening of the Karta parking lot for businesses on Shabbat, the 2007 ruling in favor of an appointment of an Arab director for the JNF, and his 2008 ruling against the dismantling of Hamas in Jerusalem.
