= State Comptroller of Israel =

Political position in Israel

Mevaker HaMedina
- מבקר המדינה
- Incumbent; Vacant since 3 June 2026
- Type: Supreme auditor Ombudsman
- Residence: Jerusalem
- Appointer: Knesset
- Term length: Seven years, single term
- Inaugural holder: Siegfried Moses
- Formation: 1949
- Website: mevaker.gov.il

The State Comptroller of Israel (Hebrew: מבקר המדינה Mevaker HaMedina, Arabic: مراقب الدولة, literally: Critic of State) inspects, reviews, and audits the policies and operations of the government of the State of Israel. The State Comptroller's Office is also the government's office for public complaints. It serves under the aegis of the Knesset and has authority to examine all agencies of government.

== History ==
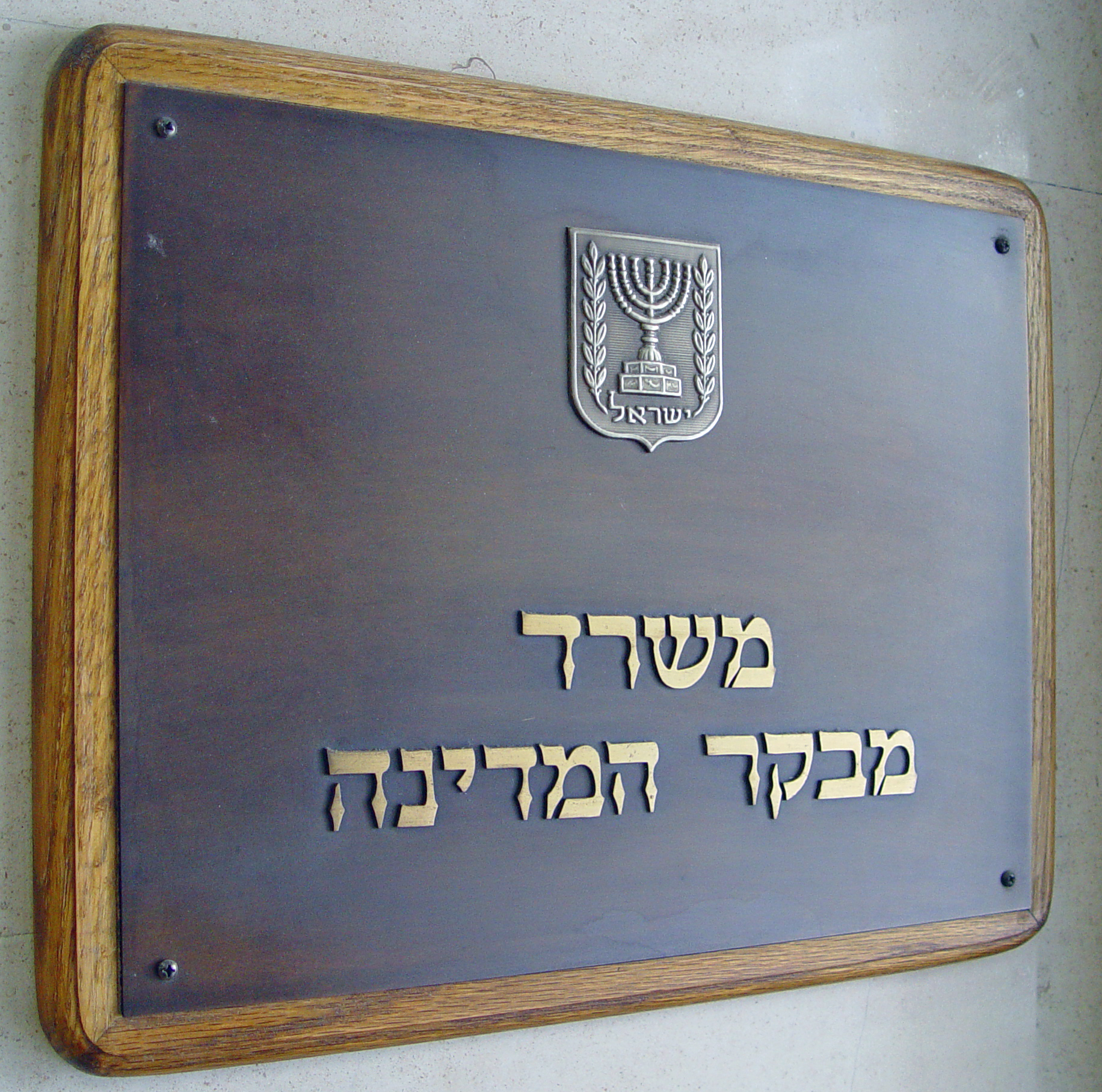
State Comptroller of Israel signboard

In 1965 the Comptroller's Office hosted V INCOSAI, the fifth triennial convention of the International Organization of Supreme Audit Institutions. The state comptroller is elected by the Knesset in a secret ballot for a single term of seven years. The state comptroller can be relieved only by the Knesset or by resignation or demise.

The comptroller may not be a member of the Knesset or otherwise engage in politics and is prohibited from any public or private activity that could create a conflict of interest with the independent performance of the duties of the office. The state comptroller, although lacking in authority to enforce compliance, has broad investigative powers and employs hundreds of staff members, including accountants, lawyers, and other relevant professionals.

The state comptroller acts in conjunction with the State Audit Committee of the Knesset and reports to it whenever necessary. The state comptroller may recommend that the State Audit Committee appoint a special commission of inquiry, but having no statutory authority of its own it relies on the Knesset to impose sanctions on errant bodies. The state comptroller's budget is submitted directly to the Finance Committee and is exempt from prior consideration by the Ministry of Finance.

The comptroller elected in 2019 to replace Yosef Shapira is Matanyahu Englman.

== Duties ==
The principal function of the state comptroller is to check on the legality, regularity, efficiency, economy, and ethical conduct of public sector institutions. The checks are performed by continuous and spot inspections of the financial accounts and activities of all ministries, the armed forces and security services, local government bodies, and any corporations, enterprises, or organizations subsidized or managed by the state in any form.

By law, the State Comptroller in Israel also functions as Ombudsman (Hebrew: נציב תלונות הציבור Netziv Tlunot HaTzibur) to whom members of the public may lodge complaints about actions by governmental bodies that have caused them harm.

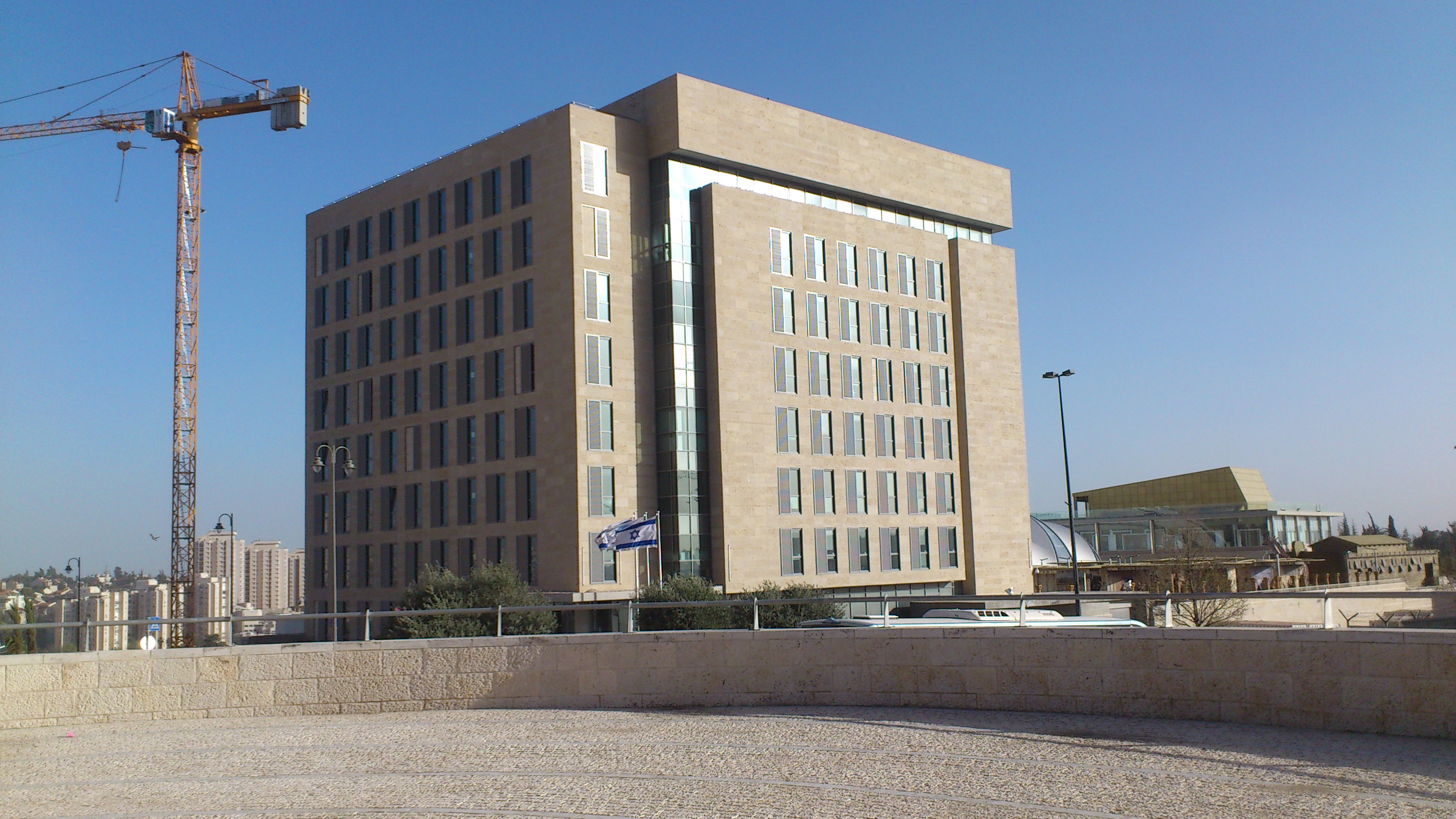
Offices of the State Comptroller of Israel

The state comptroller's office is divided into five major inspection units. The first four units are concerned, respectively, with ministries, defense services, local authorities, and corporations; the fifth inspection unit deals with public complaints concerning government bodies.

== Officeholders ==
- Siegfried Moses (1949–61)
- Yitzhak Nebenzahl (1961–81)
- Yitzhak Tunik (1982–87)
- Yaakov Malz (1987–88)
- Miriam Ben-Porat (1988–98)
- Eliezer Goldberg (1998–2005)
- Micha Lindenstrauss (2005–2012)
- Yosef Shapira (2012–2019)
- Matanyahu Englman (2019–2026)

== See also ==
- Economy of Israel
- Control Yuan, a similar function in Taiwan
