= 1959 Saga gubernatorial election =

Election for Governor of Saga Prefecture

| ← 1955 | 23 April 1959 | 1963 → |
| Nominee | Sunao Ikeda | Yoshimitsu Yanagawa | Genji Yoshida |
| Party | Independent | Independent | Independent |
| Popular vote | 290,584 | 118,494 | 32,235 |
Governor before election
Naotsugu Nabeshima
Independent
Elected Governor
Sunao Ikeda
Independent

A gubernatorial election was held on 23 April 1959 to elect the Governor of Saga Prefecture. Sunao Ikeda won the governorship in an election of three newcomers.

== Candidates ==
- Sunao Ikeda – Secretary General of the Board of Audit, age 57
- Yoshimitsu Yanagawa (柳川善光, Yanagawa Yoshimitsu) – the only non-independent candidate, age 47
- Genji Yoshida (吉田源治, Yoshida Genji) – candidate in the 1955 Saga gubernational election, age 45

== Results ==
Saga Gubernational Election 1959
| Party | Candidate | Votes | % | ±% |
|---|---|---|---|---|
| Independent | Sunao Ikeda | 290,584 | | |
| Socialist | Yoshimitsu Yanagawa | 118,494 | | |
| Independent | Genji Yoshida | 32,235 | | |
