= 1955 Saga gubernatorial election =

Election for Governor of Saga Prefecture

← 1951	23 April 1955	1959 →
Nominee	Naotsugu Nabeshima	Genji Yoshida
Party	Independent	Independent
Popular vote	385,227	41,874
Governor before election
Naotsugu Nabeshima
Independent
Elected Governor
Naotsugu Nabeshima
Independent

A gubernatorial election was held on 23 April 1955 to elect the Governor of Saga Prefecture. Incumbent Naotsugu Nabeshima defeated newcomer Genji Yoshida.

== Candidates ==
- Naotsugu Nabeshima – incumbent Governor of Saga Prefecture, age 42
- Genji Yoshida (吉田源治, Yoshida Genji), age 41

== Results ==
Saga Gubernational Election 1955
Party	Candidate	Votes	%	±%
Independent	Naotsugu Nabeshima (incumbent)	385,227		
Independent	Genji Yoshida	41,874		
